= 2009 swine flu pandemic by country =

This article deals with the status and efforts regarding the 2009 swine flu pandemic by country and continent/region.

Pandemic (H1N1) 2009–2010 by country Summary of official reports.^{‡‡}
Country
Indicators/
Cases
Deaths
Spread-Trend/
Intensity/Impact^{‡}
Confirmed^{‡‡}
Confirmed

ECDC total

14,378
Reports Total

6,724,149
19,654
United States
W
=
**
mod

(113,690)
3,433
Brazil
R
-
*
mod

(58,178)
2,135
India
W
+
*
low

33,783
2,024
Mexico
W
+
**
mod

70,715
1,316
China (mainland)

120,940
800
Turkey
R
+
**
mod

12,316
656
Argentina
W
-

low

(11,458)
626
Russia
W
+
**

25,339
604
United Kingdom^{#}
R
=
*

(28,456)
474
Canada
W
+
**

(25,828)
429
France^{~}
R
=
*
low

1,980,000
344
Spain
W
+
*

(1,538)
300
Egypt

15,812
278
Germany
N
=

low

(222,360)
258
South Korea
W
+
*
low

107,939
250
Thailand
R
=
*
low

31,902
249
Italy
W
+
**

3,064,933
244
Colombia
W
+
*
mod

4,310
272
Peru
W
-
*
low

9,165
223
Ukraine
R
+
**
mod

494
213
Ecuador
W
-
*
low

2,251
200
Japan
W
+

11,636
198
Australia
W
-

37,484
187
Poland
W
+
**
mod

(2,024)
181
Chile
W
=

low2

12,258
156
Syria

(452)
152
Greece
N
+
*

(17,977)
149
Iran

3,672
147
Venezuela
W
-
*
mod

2,187
135
Hungary
L
+

low

(283)
134
Saudi Arabia

14,500
128
Portugal
R
+
*
low

(166,922)
122
Romania
W
+
*
mod

7,006
122
Czech Republic
L
+

2,445
102
Israel
W
+
*
low

4,330
94
South Africa

12,640
93
Malaysia

12,210
92
Belarus
W
+
**
mod

88
Serbia
R
+
**
low

695
83
Hong Kong

33,109
80
Cuba
W
+
**
mod

973
69
Costa Rica
W
-
*
low

(1,867)
67
Morocco

2,890
64
Netherlands^{+}
W
+
*
low

(1,473)
62
Bolivia
W
-
*
low

2,310
59
Vietnam

11,186
58
Algeria

916
57
Finland
W
+
**

6,122
56
Slovakia
S
+

low

955
56
Paraguay
L
-
**

855
54
New Zealand
L
=
*
low

(3,199)
50
Taiwan

(5,474)
48
Sri Lanka
W
+
*
low

642
48
Moldova

2,524
46
Palestinian Territories

1,676
43
Iraq

2,880
42
Austria
W
+

low

(964)
40
Bulgaria
W
+
***

766
40

Countries with < 40 deaths
Country
Indicators ^{‡}
Confirmed cases
Deaths
Latvia
S
+

low

1,253
34
Oman

7,040
33
Georgia
L
+
*
low

1,300
33
El Salvador
R
=
*
low

834
33
Denmark
W
+
*

(651)
33
Uruguay
W
-
*
low

(550)
33
Philippines
W
-

5,212
32
Yemen

5,038
31
Kuwait

8,669
30
Mongolia

1,259
30
Norway
W
-
*
low

(12,654)
29
Sweden
W
+
***
mod

(10,985)
29
Ireland
W
=
***
mod

(3,189)
26
Macedonia
N
-

(2,600)
26
Croatia
W
+

low

(50,255)
26
Pakistan

253
25
Tunisia

1,200
24
Guatemala
N
-
*
low

1,170
24
Dominican Republic
R
+
**
mod

491
23
Lithuania
S
+

low

68
23
Singapore

(1,217)
21
Estonia
L
+
*
mod

(738)
21
Belgium
W
-
*
low

76,973
19
Jordan

3,033
19
Slovenia
L
+
*

(990)
19
Switzerland
W
+
*
low

11,221
18
Honduras
W
-
*
low

560
18
Afghanistan

853
17
Kosovo

98
14
Bosnia and Herzegovina
L

714
13
Panama
W
-
*
low

813
12
Albania
S
+
*
mod

426
12
Nicaragua
W
-
*
low

2,172
11
Indonesia
R
=
*
mod

1,098
10
Qatar

550
10
Cyprus
N

(297)
10
North Korea

28
10
Bahrain

1,325
8
Mauritius

(69)
8
Bangladesh
R
-
*
low

1,015
7
Jamaica
W
+
*
low

191
7
Montenegro
N

119
7
Cambodia
R
+
*

531
6
United Arab Emirates

125
6
Lebanon

1,838
5
Malta
R
+
**

(718)
5
Trinidad and Tobago
W
=
*
low

211
5
Sudan

145
5
Bahamas
W
+
*
mod

29
4
Madagascar

877
3
Ghana

676
3
Luxembourg
W
+
**
low

333
3
Nepal
R
+
*
low

172
3
Barbados
W
-
*
low

154
3
Armenia

119
3
Iceland
W
-
***

676
2
Macau (PRC)

2,625
2
Brunei
W
-
*
mod

971
2
Samoa

138
2
Suriname
N
=
*
low

110
2
São Tomé and Príncipe

66
2
Mozambique

57
2
Nigeria

11
2
St. Kitts and Nevis
N
=
*
low

6
2
Tanzania

770
1
Libya

764
1
Laos

242
1
Cayman Islands (UK)

121
1
Marshall Islands

115
1
Cook Islands (NZ)

106
1
Namibia

75
1
St. Lucia
W
-
*
mod

55
1
Maldives
L
-

low

35
1
Bermuda (UK)

25
1
Tonga

20
1
Falkland Islands (UK)

7
1
Solomon Islands

4
1
Other

7,052
0

Countries with no deaths
Country	Indicators ^{‡}				Confirmed cases	Deaths
Zimbabwe					1,318	0
Zambia					726	0
Jersey (UK)					702	0
Rwanda					482	0
Kenya					417	0
Senegal					325	0
Uganda					263	0
Fiji	N	-	*	low	234	0
Democratic Republic of the Congo					222	0
Myanmar	L	-		low	137	0
Cape Verde					118	0
Akrotiri and Dhekelia (UK)					92	0
Bhutan	N				91	0
Haiti	L	+		low	91	0
Micronesia					82	0
Antigua and Barbuda	R	=	*	low	75	0
Isle of Man (UK)					75	0
Lesotho					65	0
Gibraltar (UK)					62	0
Kyrgyzstan	N	=		low	61	0
Belize	W	-		mod	49	0
Niger					49	0
Palau					47	0
Faroe Islands					44	0
Turks and Caicos Islands (UK)					44	0
Angola					37	0
Dominica	N	=	*	low	36	0
Monaco					36	0
Seychelles					33	0
Botswana					31	0
Mali					29	0
Guyana					27	0
British Virgin Islands (UK)					25	0
Tuvalu					23	0
Montserrat					21	0
Republic of the Congo					21	0
Grenada	W	-	*	mod	20	0
Ethiopia					19	0
Guernsey (UK)					17	0
Kazakhstan	R	+	**	mod	17	0
St. Vincent and the Grenadines	L	=			17	0
Tajikistan					16	0
Mauritania					15	0
Anguilla (UK)					14	0
Azerbaijan	L	+	*	low	14	0
Papua New Guinea					12	0
Côte d'Ivoire					9	0
Djibouti					9	0
Nauru					8	0
Burundi					7	0
Timor-Leste	L	=		low	7	0
Liechtenstein					5	0
San Marino					5	0
Swaziland					5	0
Cameroon					4	0
Gabon					4	0
Kiribati					4	0
Guinea					3	0
Vanuatu					3	0
Somalia					2	0
Andorra					1	0
Chad					1	0
Greenland					1	0

Graph of confirmed cases

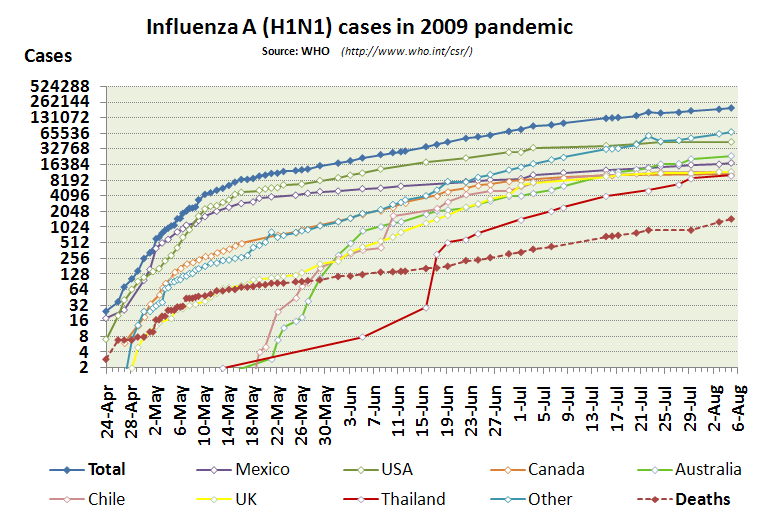
Semi-logarithmic plot of laboratory-confirmed A(H1N1) influenza cases in 2009 according to WHO reports.

^{‡}Qualitative indicators as defined by WHO. Parameter values:
Geographic spread	Trend	Intensity	Impact on health care services
W(idespread)		*** (very high)	sev(ere)
R(egional)	+ (Increasing)	** (high)	mod(erate)
L(ocal)	= (Unchanged)	* (low – moderate)	
S(poradic); I(mported); N(o activity)	(Decreasing)	(low)	low
^{‡‡}Many countries are not recommending laboratory tests for all suspect cases, the affected numbers have been put in brackets. Comparisons in time or between these countries should not be made. The number of confirmed cases is lower than the total number of cases, and may grossly underestimate the true infection rate.
^{^}Includes Puerto Rico (695 cases, 45 deaths), Guam (338 cases, 2 deaths), American Samoa (85 cases, 1 death), U.S. Virgin Islands (80 cases, 1 death), and Northern Mariana Islands (6 cases).
^{#}Does not include Overseas Territories or Crown Dependencies.
^{~}Includes New Caledonia (500 cases, 9 deaths), French Polynesia (183 cases, 7 deaths), Réunion (759 cases, 7 deaths), Mayotte (164 cases, 2 deaths), Martinique (261 cases, 1 death), French Guiana (213 cases, 1 death), Guadeloupe (197 cases, 5 deaths), Saint Martin (62 cases), Wallis and Futuna (55 cases), Saint-Barthélemy (2 cases).
^{+}Includes Aruba (13 cases) and the Netherlands Antilles (98 cases).

Confirmed cases leading to deaths Confirmed cases Unconfirmed or suspected cases See also: H1N1 live map, WHO updates

0 deaths suspected deaths 1+ deaths 5+ deaths 10+ deaths 50+ deaths 100+ deaths 500+ deaths See also: H1N1 live map, WHO updates

Confirmed community outbreaks See also: H1N1 live map, WHO updates

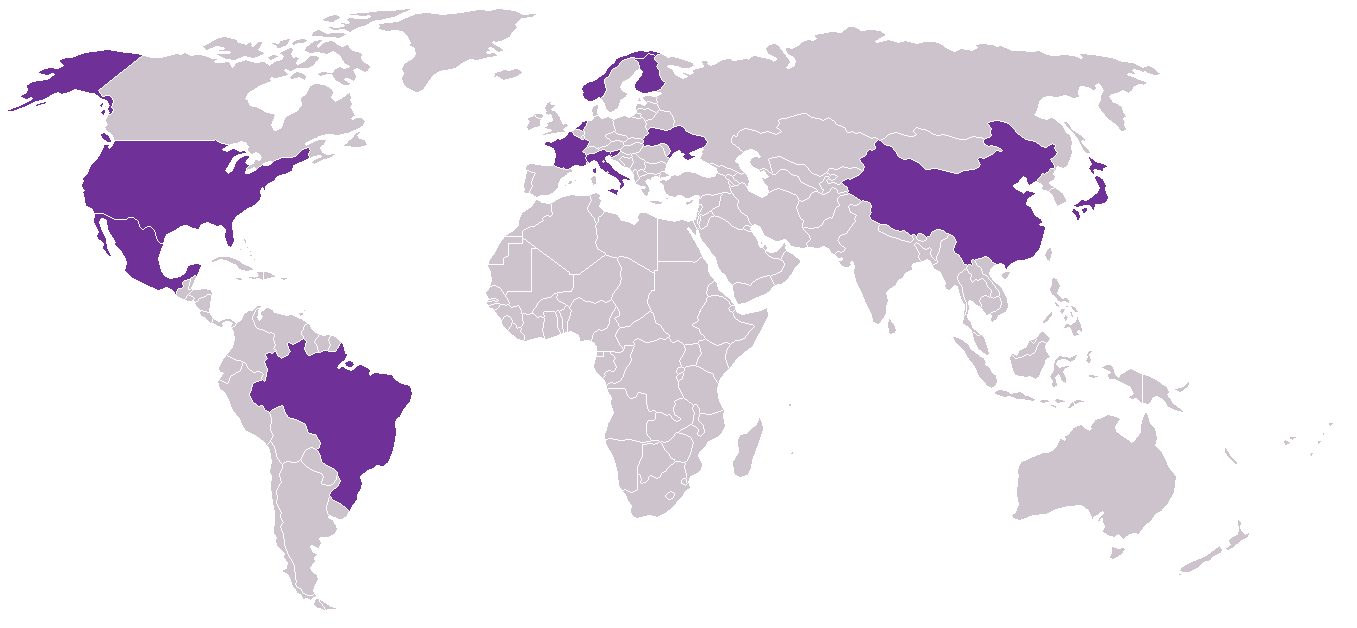
Confirmed mutation of H1N1 virus

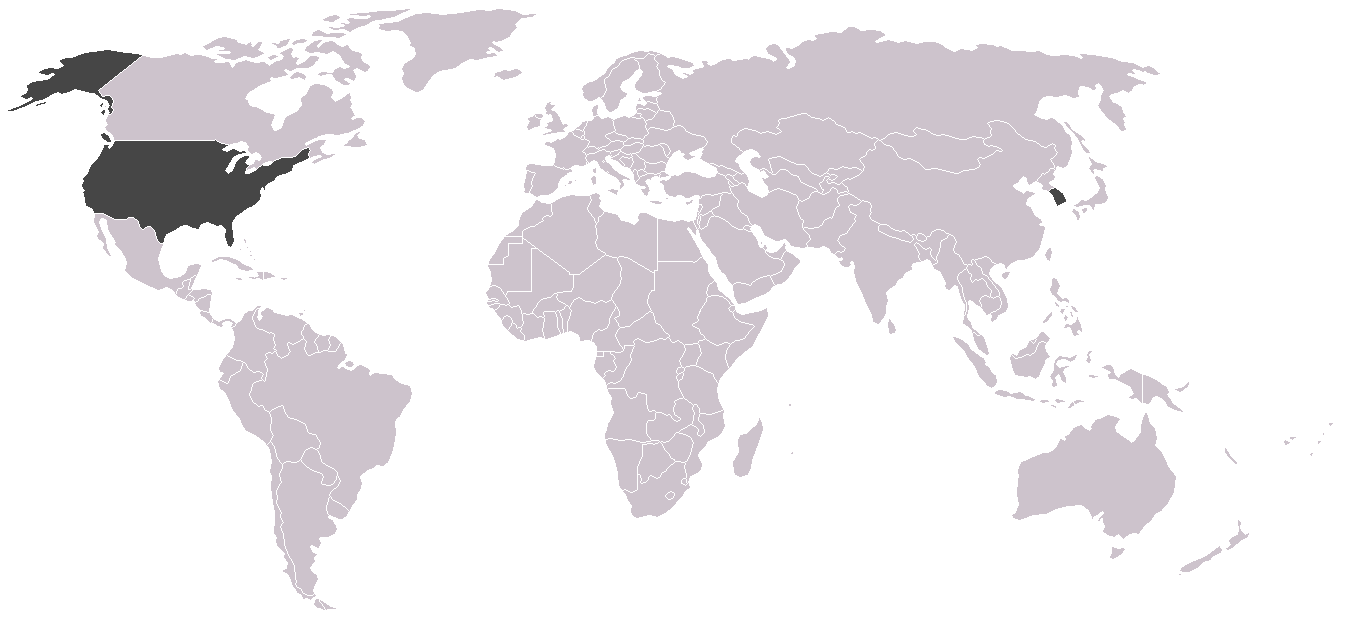
Confirmed double infections

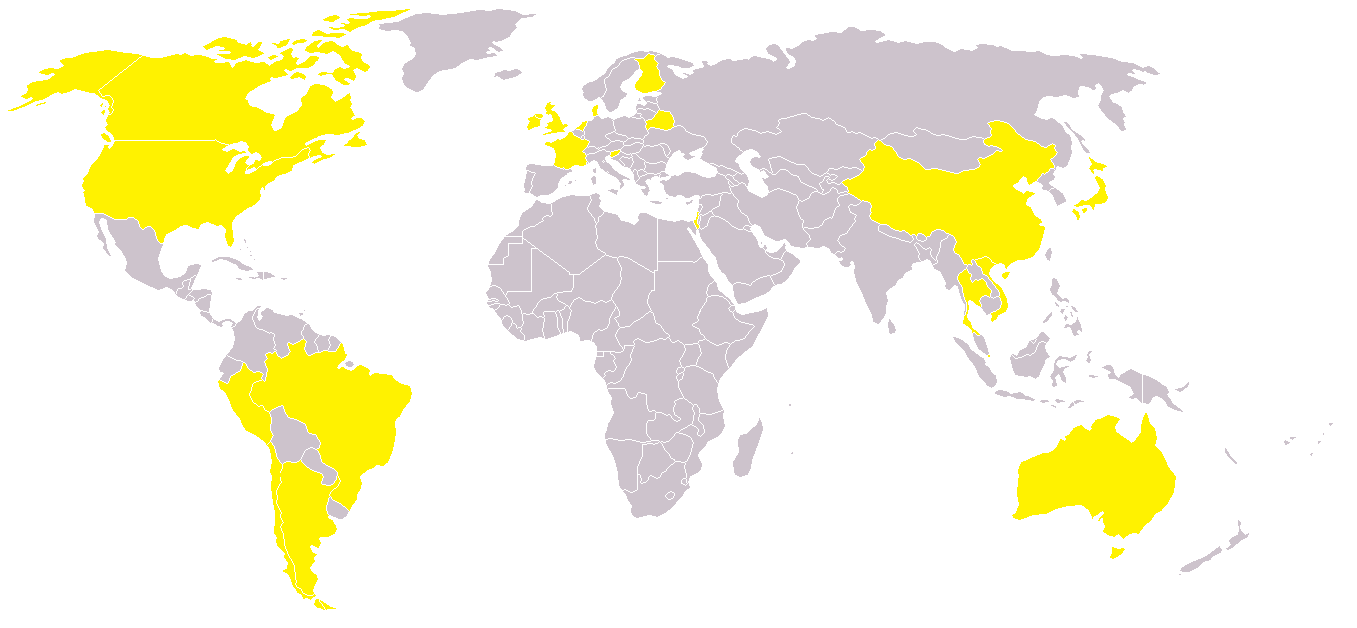
Confirmed cases of tamiflu resistance

As the pandemic progressed, laboratory testing and confirmation decreased. Confirmed figures for the United Kingdom, in particular, are only meaningful up to 2 July, when routine testing stopped and presumed cases were treated without laboratory confirmation of diagnosis. Following the recommendations of the World Health Organization (WHO), many countries stopped issuing estimates of the infected population, making this list inaccurate.

The ten countries and territories with most confirmed cases per capita
Pos.	Country	Population (Note: All population figures are estimates for July 2009 from the source: "CIA – The World Factbook". Central Intelligence Agency. Archived from the original on 1 June 2007.)	Confirmed cases	Confirmed cases per 1,000 inhabitants
1	Iceland	306,694	8,650	28.20
2	Belgium	10,414,336	214,531	20.59
3	Portugal	10,707,924	166,922	15.59
–	Cook Islands	11,870	106	8.93
–	Macao	559,846	2,625	4.68
–	Hong Kong	7,055,071	31,554	4.47
4	Spain	46,700,000	155,051	3.32
5	Kuwait	2,691,158	8,622	3.20
6	Brunei	338,190	972	2.87
–	Jersey	91,626	234	2.55
7	Germany	82,080,000	192,348	2.34
8	South Korea	48,600,000	107,939	2.22
9	Palau	20,796	46	2.21
–	Cayman Islands	49,035	105	2.14
10	Malta	405,165	718	1.77
	World	6,790,062,216	25,584,595	3.76

*Includes countries with over 40 confirmed cases only.

== Affected continents/countries ==
=== Africa ===
2009 flu pandemic in Africa: Confirmed deaths Confirmed cases Suspect cases No reported cases	No deaths 1+ deaths 5+ deaths 10+ deaths 50+ deaths 100+ deaths

The Egyptian government ordered the mass slaughter of all pigs in Egypt on 29 April, even though the current strain was a human-human transmittable, human influenza that had previously hybridized with avian flu and swine flu. The World Organisation for Animal Health called the swine killing "scientifically unjustified".

The first case of the H1N1 virus was discovered in Cairo, Egypt on 2 June 2009, in a 12-year-old girl coming from the US with her mother. Only the girl was infected and the officials caught the case before letting her out of the airport. A second and third case were discovered on Sunday 7 June, two students at the American University of Cairo. On 11 June 2 more cases were discovered, bringing the total number of cases to 12.

The swine flu was confirmed in 21 African countries: Egypt, South Africa, Morocco, Algeria, Tunisia, Ethiopia, Côte d'Ivoire, Seychelles, Cape Verde, Libya, Kenya, Uganda, Botswana, Zimbabwe, Tanzania, Mauritius, Somalia, Sudan, Namibia, Zambia, Gabon, and Rwanda.

The H1N1 virus was a concern in the months leading up to the 2010 FIFA World Cup, which took place in June 2010 in South Africa.

=== Asia ===
2009 flu pandemic in Asia Deaths Confirmed cases Suspected cases No reported cases	No deaths 1+ deaths 5+ deaths 10+ deaths 50+ deaths 100+ deaths

==== Western and Central Asia ====
H1N1 in Central Asia Deaths Confirmed cases Suspected cases No reported cases

H1N1 in Southwest Asia Deaths Confirmed cases Suspected cases No reported cases

On 27 April, Azerbaijan imposed a ban on import of animal husbandry products from America. AZAL took additional safety measures and a sanitary quarantine unit of the Health Ministry started to operate in Heydar Aliyev International Airport, checking all aircraft and passengers. On 2 May Border checkpoints with disinfection barriers for both cars and pedestrians were installed at the Samur, Shirvanovka and Khan Oba checkpoints in Qusar and Khachmaz Raions. The veterinary services at checkpoints intensified their activities while hog farms in the northern regions switched to a closed farming regime.

Seventy-seven cases were confirmed in Israel. In response to the outbreak, the Israeli Deputy Minister of Health, Yaakov Litzman, suggested that out of respect for the religious sensibilities of Jews and Muslims, the flu should be called "Mexican Flu." This was done so as to not confuse the population into thinking that they could not acquire the virus if they did not eat pork. The Israeli government retracted this proposal following Mexican complaints.

The first confirmed cases were reported in Kuwait on 23 May, after about 18 people on U.S. military bases tested positive.

On 30 May 2009 the first three cases were confirmed in Lebanon. "One Lebanese man who was in Spain and two Canadians who arrived in Lebanon a week ago are suffering from swine flu," the health minister said. "We put them in quarantine and the blood samples we have taken every day have proven to be positive. The Lebanese man and the two visiting Canadians – a woman and her daughter – were given the proper medical treatment in time and they are well now." The Lebanese Health Minister had previously asked citizens to stop the habit of social kissing, that affected schoolchildren be kept at home and that travel to countries in which cases have been confirmed be avoided. Beirut also banned the import of pork.

In Saudi Arabia, the first case, which affected a Filipino nurse working at King Faisal Specialist Hospital and Research Center, was confirmed on 1 June. The Health Ministry, in cooperation with the hospital, applied the national plan for the prevention of swine flu in accordance with WHO's recommendations. Accordingly, the patient was isolated and treated.

==== Southern Asia ====
H1N1 in South Asia Deaths Confirmed cases Suspected cases No reported cases

H1N1 in Southeast Asia Deaths Confirmed cases Suspected cases No reported cases

All people entering India via the main airport hubs of Mumbai, New Delhi, Bengaluru and other metro cities were screened. The primary focus was on passengers entering from the US, the United Kingdom, Canada, Mexico, France and New Zealand. As of 25 October, over 13,000 cases had been confirmed in India, with 444 deaths, starting with a 13-year-old girl's death in the city of Pune, where almost 91 people died.

In the Maldives, a ministerial committee was established to supervise preventive measures to avoid an outbreak. All visitors arriving at the Malé International Airport and the country's three commercial seaports were screened.

Pakistan took precautionary measures at its international airports to check passengers coming from affected countries. Doctors checked incoming passengers and allowed entry only to those with no symptoms. Major hospitals were placed on high alert.

==== Southeastern Asia ====
Since 8 July a total of 207 cases were reported in Brunei.

The Cambodian Pig Raiser Association told the government it should ban live pig imports. But Khlauk Chuon, the deputy director of Camcontrol at the Ministry of Commerce, said they would only ban live pig imports from affected countries.

The Indonesian government halted the importation of pigs and initiated the examination of 9 million pigs. Thermal scanners that can detect human body temperature were installed at Indonesian ports of entry.

The Lao government bought 10 thermal imaging machines to install at the country's major immigration border checkpoints. The Prime Minister Bouasone Bouphavanh said masks should be made available and health officials would be assigned to border checkpoints. On 22 July, Laos recorded its first death.

In Malaysia, health screenings were carried out on passengers traveling to and from Mexico via sea, air and land beginning 17 April. The Health Ministry's disease control division activated its operations room to monitor the situation and informed medical practitioners treating suspicious cases to inform the district health office immediately. Thermal scanners were installed at Kuala Lumpur International Airport. Screenings were imposed in Pengkalan Hulu, at the border with Thailand, in late April. Quarantine rooms were allocated in 28 hospitals and the country stockpiled more than 2 million doses of Tamiflu, as of May 2009. Schools were issued strict hygiene procedures on 16 May to contain any outbreak. On 15 May, the Health Ministry confirmed Malaysia's first case: a male student who had arrived via air from Newark. The first death was reported on 23 July. As of 11 August there were 2,253 confirmed cases. As of 12 August the total number of deaths in Malaysia stood at 44.

In the Philippines, thermal imaging equipment at airports was implemented to screen passengers coming from the US. The Philippines quarantined travellers arriving from Mexico with fever. The importation of hogs from the U.S. and Mexico was banned and the restriction of vaccine use was retracted. On 18 May, a Filipina girl who arrived from Houston was the first confirmed case in the Philippines. As of 15 June, there were 193 confirmed cases. On 22 June, the first death was reported.

The first case in Singapore was confirmed on 27 May. It was announced on 18 June that Singapore appeared to have its first case. As of 7 July 1,217 confirmed cases had been reported. As of 25 July, there were 4 confirmed deaths.

Vietnam's Ministry of Health released an emergency dispatch and urged agencies to take precautionary measures. Thermal imaging devices were dispatched to airports and border gates to screen passengers. In response to WHO's warnings, Vietnam on 30 April raised its alert level to 4, which indicated a "threat of community level outbreaks" while local authorities executed precautionary measures. On 1 May 2009 a Ministry of Industry and Trade official said that the Ministry was considering a ban on pork import "under certain situations". On 31 May Vietnam announced its first case, a 23-year-old student recently returned from the United States.

==== Eastern Asia ====
H1N1 in Eastern Asia Deaths Confirmed cases Suspected cases No reported cases

On 26 April, visitors returning from flu-affected areas to China who experienced flu-like symptoms within two weeks were to be quarantined. On 2 May, the Chinese government suspended flights from Tijuana to Shanghai. Meanwhile, the Civil Aviation Administration of China assigned a charter to transport stranded Chinese visitors home. The first suspected case was reported on 10 May 2009. China made aggressive use of quarantines, as by early July tens of thousands of suspected cases were quarantined in government-sanctioned facilities.

On 29 April the Food and Health Bureau of Hong Kong advised Hong Kong residents not to travel to Mexico unless absolutely necessary. The first case was a Mexican who arrived from Shanghai. The Bureau escalated the alert level from "alert" to "serious", which activated health protection measures in all ports of entry of Hong Kong. Thermal screening machines were used to identify passengers with fever and respiratory symptoms. Any passenger who is confirmed to have a fever were quarantined and sent to public hospital for investigation. Hong Kong became one of the first jurisdictions to declare the swine flu as a notifiable disease. Much of the procedures against the contagion were learned from the 2003 SARS outbreak, of which Hong Kong was the epicenter of the outbreak. On 1 May, the first case in Hong Kong and also the first in Asia was confirmed. The Mexican patient arrived in Hong Kong on 30 April. Metropark Hotel Wanchai, where the patient stayed, was quarantined. After the first case was confirmed, Hong Kong's response level was raised from "serious" to "emergency".

In Japan, live pig imports were inspected. Japanese Agriculture Minister Shigeru Ishiba appeared on television to reassure customers that it was safe to eat pork. The Japanese farm ministry said that it would not ask for restrictions on pork imports because the virus was unlikely to turn up in pork and would be killed by cooking. On 8 May, the first three cases were confirmed. The infected patients had spent time in Canada and returned to Japan via Detroit. The first domestic infection was confirmed on 16 May in Kobe. As of 18 May 130 cases had been confirmed.

South Korea warned against travel to Mexico City and three Mexican states. The government stepped up quarantine and safety checks on travelers arriving from the United States and Mexico, and pork imports from those countries. An emergency quarantine system was instituted, with simple tests conducted on people with flu symptoms at airports. On 28 April, South Korea reported its first probable case after positive preliminary tests on a nun who had recently returned from Mexico. One case was confirmed on 30 April. On 2 May, the first suspected woman turned out to be infected. South Korea became the second infected nation in Asia. On 13 September, five people died, and 1 person experienced brain death. As of November, 107,939 had been infected.

On 20 May the first case of the influenza was confirmed in Taiwan. The government had previously taken steps to prevent an outbreak, including a command center, travel alerts for infected nations, and more severe health checks at international ports. Taiwan said visitors who arrived from affected areas with fevers would be quarantined. According to The Department of Health (DOH), Taiwan had a sufficient supply of surgical masks and vaccine to deal with the flu. The DOH stated that they had 50 to 60 million masks in stock and that local manufacturers had the capability of producing 200,000 doses of the flu vaccine a month. The Centers for Disease Control announced on 28 April that every flight from the Americas, specifically Canada and the United States, that arrived in Taiwan would be subject to a strict on-board screening procedure.

On 2 July, the first case of oseltamivir-resistant virus in Asia was announced in Japan, in a woman who had been taking Tamiflu prophylactically.

On 18 July 2009, Hong Kong had its first swine flu death.

On 3 July, a case of Tamiflu-resistant virus was discovered. The woman had not previously taken Tamiflu, so concern has been expressed that she may have contracted an already resistant virus from someone else.

On 28 August 2009, the Japanese Ministry of Health, Labour and Welfare announced that it estimated approximately 760,000 people would be infected and 46,400 hospitalized per day during the expected peak month of October. Overall they predicted that 20% of rural Japanese would become infected and 30% in city areas.

=== Europe ===
Outbreak evolution in Europe: Deaths Confirmed cases Suspect cases No cases

No deaths 1+ deaths 5+ deaths 10+ deaths 50+ deaths 100+ deaths 500+ deaths 1000+ deaths 5000+ deaths

On 27 April, the Spanish Ministry of Health and Social Policy announced its first case (the first in Europe) in a 23-year-old man who had recently returned from Mexico on 22 April and had been quarantined on the 25th. The day the European Union health commissioner advised Europeans not to travel to the United States or Mexico unless urgent.

On 14 June, it was reported that the United Kingdom had its first confirmed death.

As of 22 December, every European country, apart from the 5 microstates had confirmed deaths. France had 27; Spain, 33; Norway, 29 (4 January 2010); Italy, 6; Belgium and Germany, 8; Sweden, 3 (3 November); Malta and Greece, 3; Denmark, Finland, Hungary and Luxemburg, 1; Ireland and the Netherlands, 10, and the United Kingdom, 79. The British government suggested 55,000 new cases in the week up to 16 July.

Hungary reported the first death in the country on 22 July. Ireland reported its first death on 7 August.

As of 19 August, all European countries with the exception of the micro states San Marino and Vatican City had reported cases.

=== North America ===
Outbreak distribution in North America: Deaths Confirmed cases Suspect cases No cases

No deaths 1+ deaths 5+ deaths 10+ deaths 50+ deaths 100+ deaths 500+ deaths 1,000+ deaths 5,000+ deaths

The swine flu began in Mexico, North America, which turn out to be a new strain of H1N1 virus and the first case could have been as early as March or April. In Canada, roughly 10% of the populace were infected with the virus, with 363 confirmed deaths (as of 8 December); confirmed cases had reached 10,000 when Health Canada stopped counting in July. Canada began its vaccination campaign in October and vaccinated a higher proportion of its citizens than any other country. The pandemic was a concern in the months leading to the XXI Olympic Winter Games, which took place in Vancouver in February 2010.

José Ángel Córdova Villalobos, Mexico's Secretariat of Health, stated that since March 2009, over 1,995 suspected cases and 149 deaths were confirmed. Twenty were confirmed to be linked to a new strain of Influenza A virus subtype H1N1. "'As many as 23,000 Mexicans were likely infected with the swine flu virus,' Neil Ferguson of Imperial College London and colleagues reported in the journal Science." Soldiers mobilized by the government have handed out six million surgical masks to citizens in and around Mexico City. On 24 April 2009, schools (from pre-school to university level) as well as libraries, museums, concerts and any public gathering place, were shut down by the government in Mexico City and the neighboring State of Mexico to prevent the disease from spreading further; the schools in Mexico City, the State of Mexico, and the state of San Luis Potosí would remain quarantined until at least 5 May. Marcelo Ebrard, Mexico City's mayor, asked all night-life operators to shut down their places of business for ten days to prevent further infections. On 25 April, President Felipe Calderón declared an emergency which granted him the power to suspend public events and order quarantines. On 26 April, the World Bank announced US$25 million in immediate aid loans to Mexico, an additional US$180 million for long-term assistance to address the outbreak, and advice on how other nations have responded to similar crises. On 27 April, the Secretariat of Public Education announced that all schools in Mexico would remain closed at least until 6 May. On 28 April, the Mexico City government closed all restaurants and cinemas. The National History and Anthropology Institute closed all archaeological sites and museums, including the most famous Mayan and Aztec ruins, until further notice.

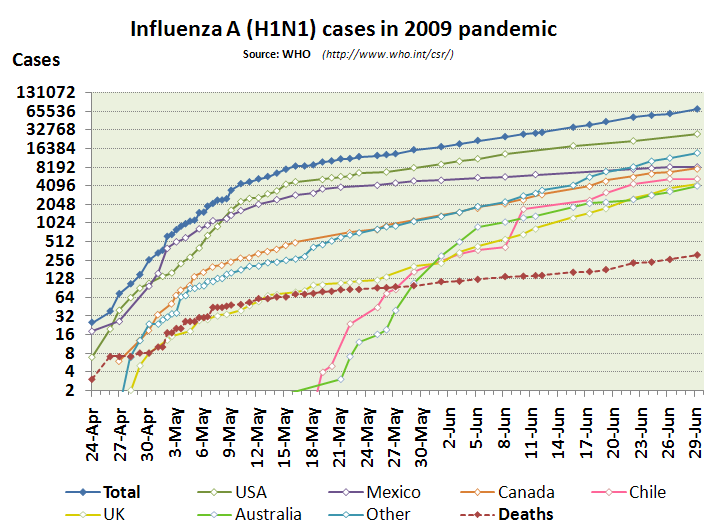
A semi-logarithmic chart of laboratory-confirmed A(H1N1) influenza cases by date according to WHO reports. Mexico, USA, and Canada are shown as a breakdown of the total.

In the United States, initial reports of atypical flu in two individuals in southern California led to the discovery of the virus by the Centers for Disease Control in mid-April. More than a hundred cases were confirmed in the following two weeks, across a dozen states. Outside of California and Texas, initial cases were all tied to recent travel to Mexico or close contact with those who had. St. Francis Preparatory School, a private school in New York, was the center of a large cluster of cases after a spring break trip by several students. It was one of the first US schools to be closed during the early outbreak. Most of the cases in California and Texas were not linked and may have reflected localized outbreaks. The disease was not as virulent outside of Mexico, for reasons not fully understood. The US declared a state of Public Health Emergency, but this was said to be standard procedure in cases as divergent as the recent inauguration and flooding. On 29 April, the US had its first confirmed death, and on 5 May the first US citizen died from swine flu. On 6 June, there were 17 confirmed deaths from swine flu in the US. By mid-May 2009 many states had abandoned testing unless serious illness and/or hospitalization were present. Because reported numbers represented only confirmed cases, they were a "very great understatement" of the total number of cases of infection, according to the CDC. From 12 April 2009 to 10 April 2010, CDC estimated there were 60.8 million cases, 274,304 hospitalizations, and 12,469 deaths in the US due to the virus.

==== Caribbean ====
H1N1 in Caribbean and Central America Deaths Confirmed cases Suspect cases No cases

In Aruba, all passengers arriving by airplane or cruise ship were required to fill out a health questionnaire beginning on 27 April 2009. Hotels and resorts were required to report to authorities if any tourists were showing flu-like symptoms. The government ordered antiviral medication and other supplies from the Netherlands and the United States. No cases were reported.

In Barbados, the first confirmed case occurred on 3 June 2009. The second case was confirmed on 6 June. The third case was confirmed on 10 June. The fourth case was confirmed on 17 June. Twenty five samples were sent to the Caribbean Epidemiology Center.

Cuba suspended flights to and from Mexico for 48 hours. The first case in Cuba was confirmed in mid-May.

The first two cases in the Dominican Republic were confirmed on 27 May. By 7 June 93 cases had been confirmed, primarily mild infections.

As of 7 July 2009, 33 cases were confirmed in Jamaica. Health Minister Ruddy Spencer told Parliament that the country had been placed on high alert. There was heightened surveillance at health care facilities and ports of entry.

In Trinidad and Tobago, one female case was confirmed.

In the Bahamas, ten students and teachers who arrived from Mexico in the last week of April were in quarantine.

==== Central America ====
No deaths 1+ deaths 5+ deaths 10+ deaths 50+ deaths 100+ deaths 500+ deaths 1,000+ deaths 5,000+ deaths

The first two cases of the flu in Costa Rica, both of whom had traveled to Mexico, were confirmed on 28 April. On 31 July local authorities announced that the country was among the sample countries that would test the vaccine developed by Swiss pharmaceutical giant Novartis. The local sample would include 784 Costa Ricans ages 3 to 64. Besides Costa Rica, this vaccine prototype would be tested in Mexico and the United States.

On 11 August, it was confirmed that Costa Rica's president, Óscar Arias Sánchez, was infected with the virus, becoming the first head of state. President Arias returned to normal activities after one week of isolation. As of 15 October the Costa Rican Ministry of Health had 1,530 confirmed cases, 1,242 pending cases and 38 deaths.

Guatemala checked all travelers arriving from Mexico and stopped anyone with symptoms at border crossings. On 5 May, in a meeting with Health Minister and the Vice President, it was announced that an 11-year-old girl was infected. As of 7 July Guatemala had 286 confirmed cases leading to two fatalities.

Honduras reported its first confirmed case on 27 May. By 7 June the country had reported 67 cases, mostly in San Pedro Sula and along the Atlantic Coastline. All airports and commercial sites as well as public events were monitored. As of 7 July there were 123 confirmed cases and one fatality.

As on 4 June 179 confirmed cases had been reported by Panamanian health authorities. Of these, 91 were male and 88 were female. Schools with positive cases were being disinfected. Thermal cameras had been deployed in Tocumen International Airport to identify symptomatic passengers.

As of 7 July, El Salvador reported 319 confirmed cases, and Nicaragua 321. Panama and Nicaragua reported no fatalities.

=== Oceania ===
Outbreak of the swine flu in Oceania: Deaths Confirmed cases Suspect cases No cases

No deaths 1+ deaths 5+ deaths 10+ deaths 50+ deaths 100+ deaths 500+ deaths 1000+ deaths 5000+ deaths

The first confirmed case in Australia was reported on 9 May. As of 3 July, Australia had 7,290 confirmed cases. The first Australian death was on 19 June and the total death toll reached 20. The alert level was raised from "delay" to "contain", giving authorities in all states the option to close schools. Australia stockpiled 8.7 million doses of Tamiflu and Relenza. At the beginning of the outbreak airlines were required to report passengers from the Americas with influenza symptoms and nurses were deployed at international airports.

Researchers in Australia and New Zealand reaffirmed that infants under the age of 1 had the highest risk of developing severe illness. Canadian health officials reported that swine flu is hospitalizing three to four times as many children as regular seasonal flu.

On 30 May, New Zealand had 9 confirmed cases and 10 probables. During June cases in New Zealand rose rapidly. On 14 June the Ministry of Health announced a 65% increase in cases in just 24 hours. On 4 July, the Ministry of Health announced the first New Zealand deaths. Three confirmed deaths were confirmed, however two had known underlying medical conditions. The total number of confirmed cases reached 945.

Two cases were confirmed in the Pacific Islands. Both cases were confirmed on 15 June, one in the Solomon Islands and another in Samoa. 5 cases were confirmed in Fiji as of 24 June and 1 case in Vanuatu.

=== South America ===
Outbreak evolution in South America: Deaths Confirmed cases Suspected cases No reported cases

No deaths 1+ deaths 5+ deaths 10+ deaths 50+ deaths 100+ deaths 500+ deaths 1000+ deaths 5000+ deaths

In Argentina, as of April, passengers with symptoms arriving from Mexico and United States were required to list where they would be should they experience any symptoms. In addition, the government stepped up safety checks, and thermal scanners were being used at airports to detect passengers with fever and other influenza symptoms. Flights from Mexico were temporarily suspended. These measures proved to be largely ineffective. As of 22 June, Argentina had 1,213 confirmed cases and 10 confirmed deaths, increasing to 52 confirmed deaths and an estimated number of as many as 100,000 infected on 2 July, as confirmed by Minister of Health Juan Luis Manzur. As of 14 July, the number of officially recognised cases skyrocketed, with 137 deaths, making the death toll in Argentina the second highest in the world at the time, behind only the US.

As of April, Brazilian airports were monitoring arrivals from affected areas, under the direction of the National Sanitary Surveillance Agency (ANVISA). Air crews were trained on signs and symptoms. As of 4 June, there were 28 confirmed cases.

The first case flu in Chile was confirmed on 17 May. On 29 May, the Chilean Health ministry confirmed the number of cases had risen to 226. On 3 June Chile had its first confirmed death, a 37-year-old man from Puerto Montt. To the date, and since laboratory tests were no longer mandatory, the estimate of cases in Chile reached 500.000 cases.

On 3 May, Minister Palacio confirmed the first case in Colombia, in a 42-year-old, who had recently traveled to Mexico. According to Palacio, only one of 18 tests sent to Atlanta was positive. The patient was isolated and put under medical treatment. On the same day, Palacio stated there were 108 suspect cases in the country. On 27 April, the Government declared a "national disaster" state which allowed health authorities to have a special budget. The government purchased 400,000 oseltamivir (Tamiflu) doses, to be distributed through the Social Protection ministry.

Health officials examined arrivals with flu symptoms. On 29 April, Ecuador closed its borders to Mexican citizens and foreigners of other nationalities arriving from Mexico for 30 days. On 15 May, health officials confirmed the first case in Ecuador. On 20 May, the Health Department confirmed 7 more new cases, raising the total to 8, and then to 41.

The first case in Peru was confirmed on 14 May. On 17 May, the second case was confirmed. He had returned from the US on 12 May, showing symptoms only two days later. On 18 May a new case was confirmed, a scholar returning from a trip to Dominican Republic. Another case of a scholar came from the same trip. The student had contact with the third victim and both studied in the same school. The Governor of Callao ordered that all passengers from any infected country be checked before their entry into Peruvian territory. The Peruvian government was to be warned of any case or symptom. This step affected the main port and airport of Peru, located in Callao. The government prepared a special area at the Hospital "Daniel Alcides Carrión" to treat cases. Slaughterhouses were inspected and screened incoming passengers from problem areas. All commercial flights from Mexico to Peru were suspended on 29 April.

In Venezuela, controls were raised at airports to prevent contagion from spreading. Travellers from the United States and Mexico with symptoms were isolated until they cleared. Pig farms in the country were "closely inspected" and medicine stockpiled. On 28 May Health Minister Jesús Mantilla confirmed the first case in a Venezuelan citizen who flew from Panama. He was isolated and treated. The following day, a second case was confirmed from another person on the same flight.

== Reporting bias ==
Epidemiologists cautioned that the number of cases reported in the early days of an outbreak could be very inaccurate. Causes included selection bias, media bias and incorrect reporting by governments.

Selection bias in epidemiology occurs when authorities in different jurisdictions look at differing sets of patient. For example, in the early days of the pandemic, doctors in Mexico may have been concentrating on patients in hospitals, rather than the larger vulnerable population. This may in part explain the higher mortality recorded there. Conversely, it is implausible that few, if any, died in Mexico while Brazil and the United States accumulated hundreds of additional lab-confirmed deaths. Media bias may have skewed incidence maps based on these media reports. Countries with poor health care systems and poor laboratory facilities may take longer to identify suspected cases, analyse those cases and report them.

Passive data collection methodologies (waiting for the patient to arrive at a health care facility) are considered inferior to active data collection techniques (performing random stratified sampling) due to selection bias and because laboratory facilities to perform swift genetic tests on patient samples are not widely available. As of July 2009 no properly controlled epidemiological studies had been conducted for the 2009 outbreak.

== See also ==
- 2009 swine flu pandemic tables
