= Mantilla (surname) =

Mantilla is a surname. Notable people with the surname include:

- Agustin Mantilla (1944–2015), Peruvian economist, sociologist and politician
- Ángeles Mantilla, Mexican chemical engineer
- Blanca Alvarez Mantilla (1931–2000), Spanish journalist
- Carlos Alberto Rentería Mantilla (1945–2020), former Colombian narcotrafficker and crime boss, presumed leader of the Norte del Valle Cartel
- Evelyn Mantilla (born 1963), American politician from Connecticut
- Fabio Gadea Mantilla (born 1931), Nicaraguan radio journalist, writer, and politician
- Félix Mantilla (disambiguation), several people
- Francisco de Burgos Mantilla (1612–1672), Spanish Baroque painter of portraits and still lifes
- Jesús Mantilla, Minister of Public Health and Social Development of Venezuela up to 2009
- Luis Mantilla (1911–1987), Peruvian sports shooter
- Manuel Mantilla (born 1973), Cuban amateur flyweight boxer
- María Isabel Ortiz Mantilla (born 1975), Mexican politician affiliated with the PAN
- María Julia Mantilla (born 1984), Peruvian actress, dancer, model, teacher and beauty queen who won Miss World 2004 in China
- Matias Mantilla (born 1981), Argentine footballer
- Pablo Antonio Vega Mantilla (1919–2007), Roman Catholic Bishop of Juigalpa, Nicaragua,
- Pepe Mantilla, Mexican sports broadcaster for the Los Angeles Lakers and USC Trojans football
- Philip Sparrdal Mantilla (born 1993), Swedish footballer, defender in IFK Mariehamn
- Ramón Mantilla Duarte (1925–2009), Colombian bishop of the Roman Catholic Diocese of Ipiales
- Ray Mantilla (born 1934), American jazz drummer
- RhonniRose Mantilla (born 2000), American actress
- Rosmit Mantilla (born 1982), Venezuelan politician
- Tupac Mantilla (born 1978), Grammy-nominated percussionist from Bogotá, Colombia
