= African swine flu =

African swine flu may refer to:

- 2009 swine flu pandemic in Africa
- African swine fever, sometimes incorrectly referred to as flu
