= Territory-wide System Assessment =

Hong Kong academic assessment

- Traditional Chinese: 全港性系統評估
- Yale Romanization: Chyùhn góng sing haih túng pìhng gú
- Jyutping: Cyun^{4} gong^{2} sing^{3} hai^{6} tung^{2} ping^{4} gu^{2}

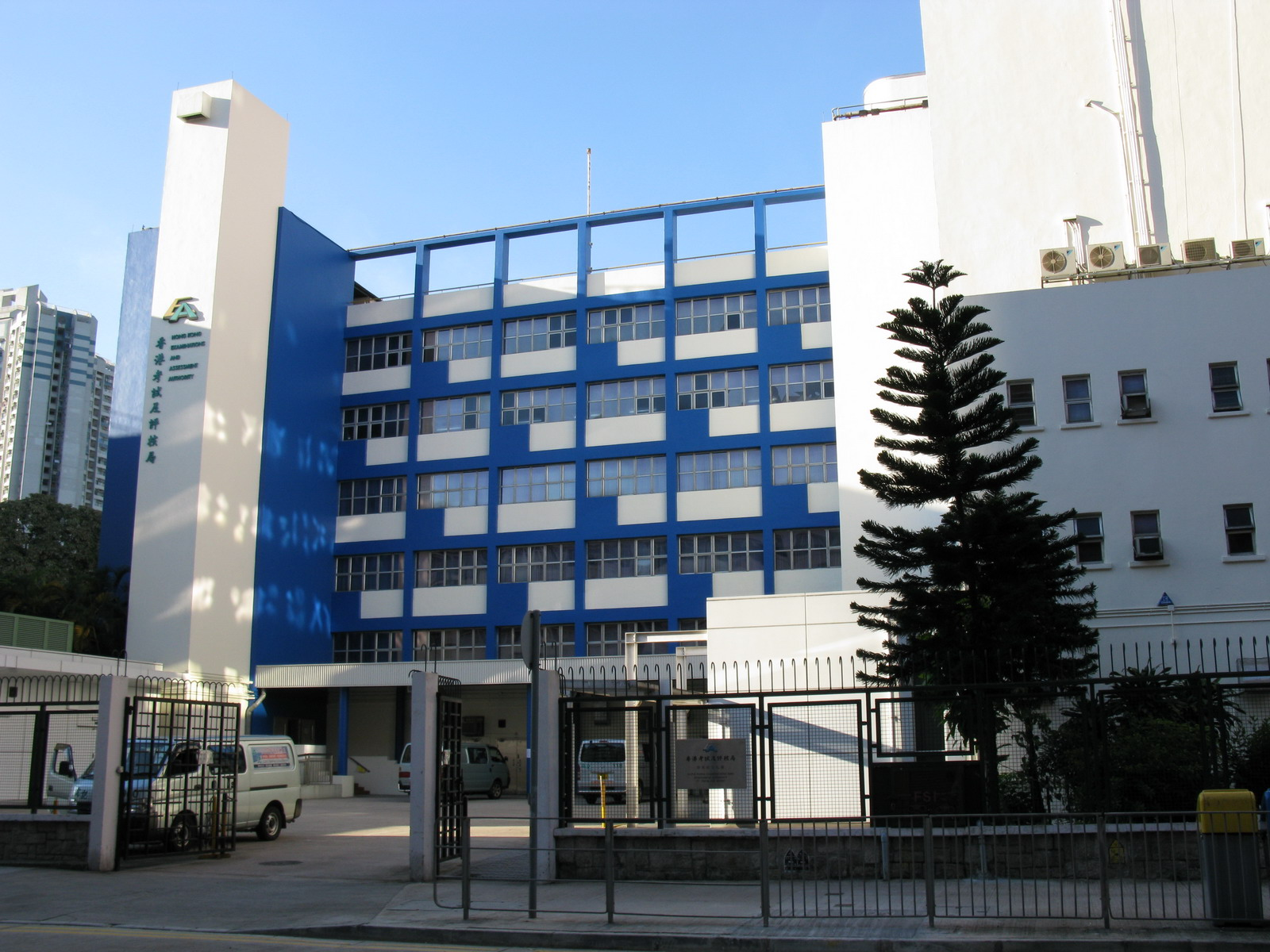
HKEAA San Po Kong Office

The Territory-wide System Assessment (TSA) is an assessment introduced by the Education Commission in the report of "Reform Proposal for the Education System in Hong Kong" in September 2000.

The Territory-wide System Assessment is held in June every year since 2004 for students of Primary 3, Primary 6 (implemented in alternate year starting from 2011) and Secondary 3. The Territory-wide System Assessment is designed for facilitating learning and teaching after evaluating the average learning standard of the students in the subject of Chinese language, English language and Mathematics at the end of key stage 1-3.

== Introduction ==
The Territory-wide System Assessment (TSA) is a territory-level assessment launched and administered by the Education Bureau (Chinese:教育局) since 2004. The aims of the Territory-wide System Assessment is to objectively assess the basic learning competencies and learning progress of the students at different stages of learning. The capabilities of students are analysed through the Territory-wide System Assessment in order to improve the effectiveness in learning and teaching. Educational policies can be reviewed with the help of the data collected through the Territory-wide System Assessment.

The Territory-wide System Assessment is conducted in the form of pencil and paper (except Chinese and English oral assessment) and the examined subjects are Chinese Language, English Language and Mathematics. The Territory-wide System Assessment is compulsory for all Primary 3, Primary 6 and Secondary 3 students from government-subsidised schools. The assessment results of the students with certain disabilities such as dyslexia or intellectual disability can be excluded after getting medical approval.

== Subjects Examined ==
=== Chinese Language ===
The assessment of Chinese language is divided into 5 sub-papers each with a focus on a specific skill of reading, writing, listening, oral and multimedia information respectively. Meanwhile, candidates from primary three, six and secondary three will be chosen randomly to apply the test of multimedia information in every school.

==== Writing Assessment ====
- Primary three and Primary six

Assessment Time: 40 minutes

Number of questions: 2

Question Form: short essay (mainly narrative, descriptive essay) and practical writing (letter, invitation card, memo, notice, diary, journal, etc)

Word Limitation: No

- Secondary three

Assessment Time: 75 minutes

Number of Questions: 2

Question Form:Specified writing and practical writing (mainly announcement, notice, speech and reports, etc)

Word Limitations: No

==== Listening Assessment ====
- Assessment Time: approximately 20 minutes
- Type of Recording: two to three parts (depends on the recordings’ nature)
- Recording Format: recording will only be played once
- Question Form: Multiple choice questions

==== Reading Assessment ====
- Primary three and Primary six

Assessment Time: 25 minutes

Number of Questions: two short stories and one to two practical writings (depends on the questions’ nature)

Type of passages: narrative, exposition and practical writing (letter, invitation card, etc)

Question Form: Multiple choice questions, fill in the blanks, sentence ordering, short questions, etc

- Secondary three

Assessment Time: 30 minutes

Type of passages: Vernacular Chinese (Narration, Description, Exposition, Argumentation, and lyrical literature. etc), Classical Chinese, practical passage

Question Form: Multiple choice questions

==== Multimedia Information Assessment ====
- Primary three and Primary six

Assessment Time: 15 minutes

Participants: 30 students

Type of Video: two to three parts (depends on the videos’ nature)

Video Format: video will only be played once

Question Form: Multiple choice questions

- Secondary three

Assessment Time: 15 minutes

Participants: all secondary three students

Video Format: video will only be played once

Question Form: Multiple choice questions

==== Oral Assessment ====
Assessment Time: approximately four to eight minutes

Participants: twelve to twenty-four students

Form of Assessment:

1. Storytelling through pictures
2. Group Discussion
- Secondary three

Assessment Time: approximately seven to eleven minutes

Participants: twelve to twenty-four students

Form of Assessment:

1. Individual Speech
2. Group Discussion

=== English Language ===
The assessment of English language in primary school is divided into 3 sub-papers each with a focus on a specific skill of reading and writing, listening and speaking respectively. The assessment of English language in secondary school is divided into 4 sub-papers each focus on a specific skill of reading, writing, listening and speaking respectively. Candidates from every school will be chosen randomly to attend the speaking assessment.

==== Reading and writing Assessment ====
The question form of Reading part is Multiple choice question. The Writing part requires to write an essay based on a topic or write a story based on the pictures given.

- Primary three

Assessment time: 25 minutes

Word limit for Writing part: Write about 30 words

- Primary six

Assessment time: 50 minutes

Word limit for Writing part: Write about 80 words

- Secondary three

Assessment time for Reading part: 30 minutes

Assessment time for Writing part: 40 minutes

Word limit for Writing part: Write about 150 words.

==== Listening Assessment ====
The question form of primary school assessment is Multiple choice question while the question forms of secondary school assessment are Multiple choice question and filling the blanks. Each recording will be played twice.

- Primary three

Assessment time: 20 minutes

- Primary six

Assessment time: 30 minutes

- Secondary three

Assessment time: 25 minutes

==== Speaking Assessment ====
- Primary three

Preparation time: 2 minutes

Assessment time: 3 minutes

The assessment is divided into two parts. Part 1 is reading alone and part 2 is answering one question asked by teacher.

- Primary six

Preparation time: 2 minutes

Assessment time: 3 minutes

The assessment is divided into two parts. Part 1 is reading alone and part 2 is answering one question asked by teacher.

- Secondary three

Preparation time: 3 minutes

Assessment time: 2 minutes

Candidates are required to give an individual presentation

=== Mathematics ===
The assessment of Mathematics is provided in both Chinese and English according to different needs of students. Every student from all schools have to apply this assessment.

- Assessment time:
1. Primary three: 40 minutes
2. Primary six: 50 minutes
3. Secondary three: 65 minutes
- Dimension:
1. Number and Algebra
2. Shape and Space
3. Measures
4. Data Handling

== Timeline - Problems and Controversy ==
2009

See also: 2009 flu pandemic in Hong Kong

- In 2009, because of the first known cluster of local transmission of the swine flu in Hong Kong, the Education Bureau (Chinese:教育局) ordered the closure of all primary schools and the cancellation of the Territory-wide System Assessment this year. However, the listening assessment which had been held on 23 and 24 June was not affected.

2014

- In the Secondary 3 Chinese Language Territory-wide System Assessment 2014, two schools wrongly distributed the reading and writing papers to the students and this was the first case since the start of Territory-wide System Assessment in 2004. The two schools involved were the Tung Wah Group of Hospitals Sun Hoi Directors' College and the PAOC Ka Chi Secondary School respectively.

2015

- Parents concerning the effects brought by the Territory-wide System Assessment started an online petition, requesting a cancellation of the Primary 3 Territory-wide System Assessment exam. As most of the schools require students to finish large amount of complementary exercises and attend extra lessons conducted for the Territory-wide System Assessment, parents worrying about the health and mental states of children requested for the cancellation of the exam. Tens of thousands of parents signed a Facebook petition calling for the Primary Three exams to be cancelled, saying they put too much pressure on children.
- Details
  - 30 October --- Kau Yan School, a private primary school in Sai Ying Pun, announced that it would boycott the tests this academic year, saying the scheme was not in line with the school's mission and was no good for students.
  - 31 October --- The Education Bureau (Chinese: 教育局) admitted that there were problems with the controversial Territory-wide System Assessment and had pledged to review the assessments.
