= 2009 swine flu pandemic in Oceania =

Pandemic in Oceania

Detected human cases in countries in the Oceania
| Country | Cases | | Deaths |
| Country | Laboratory confirmed | Estimated cases | Confirmed (Suspected)^{‡} |
|---|---|---|---|
| Total | 19,912 | 110,355 | 64 |
| Australia | 17,061 | 27,000 | 193 |
| New Zealand | 3,067 | 20,000 | 15 |
| Vanuatu | 10 | 15 | 1 |
| Tonga | 9 | 20 | 1 |
| Guam^{###} | 7 | 10 | 1 |
| Fiji | 97 | 200 | 0 |
| New Caledonia | 16 | 20 | 0 |
| French Polynesia^{#} | 11 | 15 | 0 |
| Marshall Islands | 4 | 15 | 0 |
| Papua New Guinea | 1 | 5 | 0 |
| Federated States of Micronesia | 1 | 5 | 0 |
| Samoa | 9 | 15 | 0 |
| Cook Islands^{##} | 8 | 10 | 0 |
| Palau | 8 | 10 | 0 |
| Solomon Islands | 5 | 10 | 0 |
| Northern Mariana Islands | 3 | 5 | 0 |
Notes:^{#}dependency of France ^{##}dependency of New Zealand ^{###}dependency of the United States
Summary: Number of countries in the Oceania with confirmed cases: 7 And only one dependency with confirmed cases (30 June 2009)

The 2009 flu pandemic in Oceania, part of an epidemic in 2009 of a strain of influenza A virus subtype H1N1 caused what has been commonly called swine flu. This pandemic affected over 22,000 people in Oceania, with 56 confirmed deaths. Almost all of the cases in Oceania were in Australia, where the majority of cases resulted from internal community spread of the virus. In addition, the government of New Zealand, where most of the remainder of cases in Oceania occurred, was on high alert throughout the pandemic for any people travelling into the country with flu-like symptoms.

| Confirmed deaths Confirmed cases Suspect cases No cases | Community Outbreaks |
| 50 000+ confirmed cases 5 000+ confirmed cases 500+ confirmed cases 50+ confirmed cases 5+ confirmed cases 1+ confirmed cases | No deaths 1+ deaths 5+ deaths 10+ deaths 50+ deaths 100+ deaths 500+ deaths 1000+ deaths 5000+ deaths |

== Australia ==
| 50 000+ confirmed cases 5 000+ confirmed cases 500+ confirmed cases 50+ confirmed cases 5+ confirmed cases 1+ confirmed cases | No deaths 1+ deaths 5+ deaths 20+ deaths 100+ deaths 500+ deaths | Confirmed cases Deaths Suspect cases No cases |

On July 9, 2009, 7,290 cases were confirmed in Australia with 20 confirmed deaths. The alert level was lifted from "delay" to "contain" at this junction, giving authorities in all states the option to close schools if students were at risk.

At the time, Australia had a stockpile of 8.7 million doses of Tamiflu and Relenza. Airlines were required to report passengers from the Americas with influenza symptoms, and nurses were deployed at international airports.

On May 9, 2009, the first confirmed case in Australia was reported.

On May 20, 2009, four additional cases were reported, one in New South Wales and three in Victoria.

On May 21, 2009, an additional case was reported in Victoria. Victorian health authorities closed Clifton Hill Primary School for two days (initially) after three brothers who returned to the school from a trip to Disneyland were confirmed to have H1N1.

On May 22, 2009, cases were reported in South Australia and Victoria, including the first reported cases where the virus was contracted in Australia.

On May 25, 2009, the first confirmed case in Western Australia was reported.

On May 26, 2009, 3 additional cases were reported in Sydney. The confirmed cases involved two children who arrived in Sydney on the cruise ship named Pacific Dawn and another child who had recently returned from a trip to the United States. NSW Health issued a directive to the 2000 passengers who arrived in Sydney on the Pacific Dawn requiring that they stay at home for 7 days.

On June 19, 2009, the first confirmed death from swine flu in Australia was a 26-year-old Aboriginal man from Kiwirrkurra Community in the Western Desert of Western Australia who died in Royal Adelaide Hospital.

== Fiji ==
On April 29, 2009, Fiji moved to high alert against the swine flu virus. Authorities admitted that the Pacific island nation was not immune to the rapidly spreading global threat.

On April 30, 2009, a traveler suspected of having been infected by the swine flu virus was put under close surveillance at Lautoka Hospital, according to the Health Ministry. Hours later, the Health Ministry said there were two suspected cases. 2 cases of H1N1 were later confirmed in Fiji.

On June 30, 2009 there were 10 confirmed cases of swine Flu in Fiji.

On July 10, 2009, a total of 52 cases of swine flu were confirmed in the nation.

== French Polynesia ==
On April 28th the same year, French Polynesia had reported no cases of swine flu. However, recognizing that the pandemic could reach the country, French Polynesian officials installed a thermal imaging camera at Faa'a International Airport in Tahiti on April 27, 2009, to screen all arriving international passengers. At the time, French Polynesia had 48,000 Tamiflu anti-viral treatments available in case of an outbreak, and in the case of an outbreak, more anti-virals would able to be flown into Tahiti within twenty-four hours. On June 10, 2009, French Polynesia reported its first confirmed case in the islands.

== Marshall Islands ==
On July 20, 2009, there were 4 confirmed cases in the Marshall Islands.

== New Caledonia ==
On June 2, 2009, the authorities in New Caledonia refused to allow the Dawn Princess, a cruise-ship from Australia, to dock because five patients on board had flu-like symptoms.

== New Zealand ==
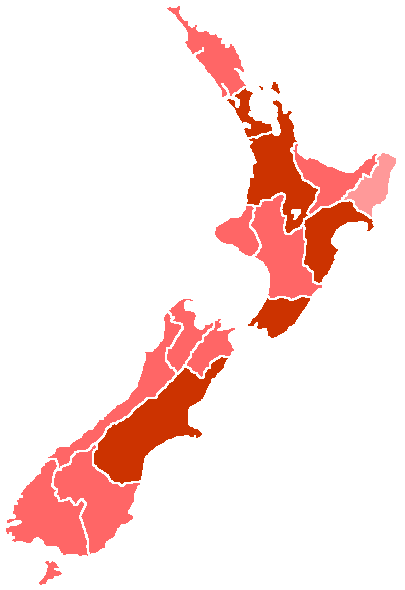
New Zealand 50+ Confirmed cases 5-49 Confirmed cases 1-4 Confirmed cases

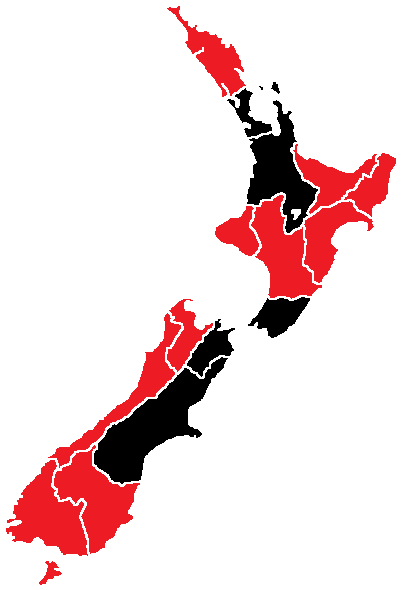
New Zealand Deaths Confirmed cases

The impact in New Zealand was unprecedented, with school closures across the country. However, it seems as though the broader effects of the pandemic in the country were isolated to sporadic instances of community transmission.

On Saturday April 25, 2009 ten students from Rangitoto College, a secondary school in North Shore City, Auckland, exhibited influenza symptoms on returning from a three-week language trip to Mexico. All 22 students and three accompanying teachers from the trip and those in close contact with them were placed in voluntary home isolation and treated with oseltamivir. The ten students tested positive for an influenza A virus, with three of them later testing positive for swine flu. The symptoms were reportedly mild and all affected individuals recovered.

New Zealand has had a well-developed Influenza Pandemic action plan since 2006. Following this plan in response to the pandemic, New Zealand immediately upgraded its influenza pandemic alert status to code yellow, and the national stockpile of 1.4 million doses of oseltamivir was released to regional health authorities. The initial response as specified in the Pandemic Action Plan was a policy of border control and cluster control via voluntary quarantine and treatment of contacts with oseltamivir. This policy was successful in preventing swine flu from spreading within New Zealand.

New Zealand had about 48,000 influenza cases in the 2008 flu season – 42% of which were type A – and approximately 100 deaths a year directly attributed to influenza viruses.

As of July 21, 2009, there were 2,255 confirmed cases and 10 deaths within New Zealand. The Ministry Of Health changed plan from 'Containment' to 'Care in the Community'.

== Palau ==
Palau also issued a health alert for swine flu. Health Minister Stevenson Kuartei told reporters that although there were no reported cases in Palau, a Task Force had been convened to increase screening of passengers entering the country. On July 5, 2009, Palau confirmed its first case.

== Papua New Guinea ==
Papua New Guinea Deaths Confirmed cases Unconfirmed or suspected cases No cases

On June 15, 2009, a young Port Moresby adult contracted the disease.

Mathias Sapuri, Deputy Chairman of Pacific International Hospital and member of the National Health Board of Papua New Guinea, said officials were doing all they can to try to limit the spread of the virus.

Sapuri also said that health staff were visiting the provinces with medication and test kits to help with their preparedness.

On July 2, 2009, one case was confirmed in the country.

== Samoa ==
On June 15, 2009, Health Authorities confirmed the first case of flu in Samoa in a young Australian student who tested positive.

== Solomon Islands ==
A multi-sectoral task force was activated by the Solomon Islands Ministry of Health to deal with the swine flu.

Permanent Secretary of the Ministry of Health and Medical Service Lester Ross said at the time that a task force was managing the Solomon Island Ministry of health's response to the threat of a swine flu epidemic.

On June 15, 2009, Solomon Island Health Authorities confirmed the first case of swine flu.

== Tokelau ==
Most supplies and food shipments to Tokelau are sent by ferry from the neighboring country of Samoa. As a result, the Samoa Health Ministry cancelled all travel to Tokelau as a precaution against the introduction of swine flu to the Tokelauan population. The Operations Manager for the Tokelau Office in Apia, Samoa, Makalio Ioane, confirmed that some ferry travel would still be allowed to Tokelau, but the ship's crew would not be allowed to leave the boat or dock in Tokelau. The boat was to be offloaded without any physical contact with the Tokelauan population. No cases of swine flu had yet been reported on Tokelau, so the cessation of travel to Tokelau was considered a precaution against potential new cases arising.

== Tonga ==
Tonga confirmed its first death from swine flu in July 2009.

== Nauru ==
One suspected case of swine flu was identified in Nauru. As such, travelers entering Nauru were screened for influenza symptoms, especially on incoming flights originating from North America.

== Vanuatu ==
Travelers entering the country via Santo-Pekoa International Airport and Bauerfield International Airport were screened using body heat detection before being allowed to exit the airport's gates. The first case was confirmed in Vanuatu.

== Timeline ==
| 2009 | A(H1N1) Outbreak and Pandemic Milestones in Oceania |
|---|---|
| 28 April | First case confirmed in New Zealand. |
| 9 May | First case confirmed in Australia. |
| 28 May | Community outbreaks confirmed in Australia. |
| 10 June | First case confirmed in French Polynesia. |
| 15 June | First confirmed case in Solomon Islands. |
| 16 June | First confirmed case in Samoa. |
| 18 June | First confirmed case in Papua New Guinea. |
| 19 June | First confirmed death in Australia. |
| 21 June | First case confirmed in Fiji. |
| 24 June | First case confirmed in Vanuatu. |
| 27 June | First case confirmed in New Caledonia. |
| 4 July | First confirmed death in New Zealand. |
| 5 July | First case confirmed in Palau. |
| 7 July | First case confirmed in Cook Islands. |
| 11 July | Community outbreaks confirmed in New Zealand. |
| 14 July | First case confirmed in Marshall Islands. |
| 15 July | First case confirmed in Tonga. |
| 20 July | First death confirmed in Guam. |
| 21 July | First case confirmed in Federated States of Micronesia. |
| 21 July | First case confirmed in Northern Mariana Islands. |
| 22 July | First death confirmed in Tonga. |
| 23 July | First case confirmed in American Samoa. |
| 26 July | Community outbreaks confirmed in Fiji. |
| 31 July | First case confirmed in Nauru. |
| 6 August | First case confirmed in Kiribati. |
| 7 August | First death confirmed in Samoa. |
| 12 August | First case confirmed in Wallis and Futuna. |
| 18 August | First death confirmed in Cook Islands. |
| 22 August | First death confirmed in New Caledonia. |
| 24 August | First death confirmed in French Polynesia. |
| 3 September | First death confirmed in Marshall Islands. |
| 11 September | First case of Oseltamivir (Tamiflu) resistance found in Australia. |
| 15 September | First death confirmed in Solomon Islands. |
