= 2009 swine flu pandemic in South America =

The 2009 flu pandemic in South America was part of a global epidemic in 2009 of a new strain of influenza A virus subtype H1N1, causing what has been commonly called swine flu. As of 9 June 2009, the virus had affected at least 2,000 people in South America, with at least 4 confirmed deaths. On 3 May 2009, the first case of the flu in South America was confirmed in a Colombian man who recently travelled from Mexico – since then, it has spread throughout the continent. By far, the most affected country has been Chile, with more than 12,000 confirmed cases, 104 deaths, and the highest per capita incidence in the world.

The World Health Organization warned about the arrival of the winter in the Southern Hemisphere, where there are seasonal peaks of flu, that could increase the number of infections.

== Overview ==
Outbreak evolution in South America: Confirmed cases followed by death Confirmed cases Unconfirmed or suspected cases

Outbreak evolution in South America: 5000+ cases 500+ cases 50+ cases 5+ cases 1+ cases

Community Outbreaks in South America: Community Outbreaks

Cases by country
Country	Cases		Deaths
Country	Laboratory confirmed	Estimated Cases	Confirmed
Totals	71,237	2,686,934	2,473
Brazil	28,886	+1,000,000	1,205
Chile	12,252	+600,000	132
Argentina	9,119	~1,000,000	580
Peru	9,268	+100,000	221
Colombia	4,310	139,621	272
Uruguay	3,056	10,000	33
Bolivia	2,269	5,000	56
Ecuador	2,002	3,000	67
Venezuela	1,782	~10,000	91
Paraguay	682	6,044	42
French Guiana	191	~200	1
Guyana	73	100	0
Suriname	67	70	2
Falkland Islands	7	20	1

== Affected countries ==
=== Argentina ===
Outbreak evolution in Argentina Confirmed deaths Confirmed cases Unconfirmed or suspected cases

Outbreak evolution in Argentina 1+ death 10+ deaths 50+ deaths

Outbreak evolution in Argentina 50+ cases 10+ cases <5 cases

Following an Epidemic Alert order issued by the Ministry of Health, airlines were required to report passengers with influenza symptoms arriving from Mexico and United States. These passengers had to additionally fill out a form specifying their whereabouts, should they experience any symptoms. In addition, the government also stepped up safety checks, and thermal scanners were used on airports to detect passengers with fever and other influenza symptoms. In 28 April, the Government suspended all flights originating from Mexico until 15 May as a precautionary measure.

On 7 May, Health Authorities confirmed the first case, a tourist that had recently returned from Mexico. 55 other suspected cases continue to be studied under isolation.

On 15 June, the first confirmed death was reported. There were also 89 new confirmed cases, increasing the number of cases to 733.

On 25 June, a case of human-to-swine transmission was discovered in Buenos Aires province, resulting in the interdiction of the hog farm where it occurred.

On 2 July, the newly appointed Minister of Health Juan Luis Manzur estimated the number of affected people to be as many as 100,000, as well as 52 confirmed deaths.

As of 14 July, the number of officially recognised cases had gone up to 137 deaths.

=== Bolivia ===
H1N1 deaths in Bolivia Confirmed deaths Confirmed cases

H1N1 in Bolivia

As of 15 September, according to Agencia Boliviana de Información the number of cases is over 1,600 . The department with most cases is Santa Cruz with more than 900 cases. Owing to the increasing number of cases Bolivian authorities have given students two additional weeks of vacations, and are canceling concerts and other big events. Viru Viru International Airport (Santa Cruz) authorities are checking every international and national passenger arriving. The Daddy Yankee concert is already suspended and now expected for August. The only department with no cases is Pando, and it is the least populated department. Two deaths were confirmed on 10 July, One of a six-year-old girl and one of a 50-year-old man, both from Santa Cruz. Most museums, cinemas and theaters are closed in Santa Cruz. Most restaurants are open and the biggest cinema in Bolivia, Cine Center, is open. The third death has been confirmed on 16 July. It was the first confirmed death in the department of La Paz. Pando, the only department in Bolivia, previously without the flu, has now some suspected cases. As at 21 July Bolivia has five confirmed deaths. The number of cases and deaths are increasing every day. Recently deaths have been confirmed in Tarija and Potosi making the numbers of deaths rise to nine. Confirmed deaths in El Alto and Cochabamba raised the numbers of deaths to 13. Some private and public schools have closed in Santa Cruz after finding students infected with the flu. The actual number of deaths is now 35.

=== Brazil ===
Community Outbreaks
Unconfirmed Outbreaks

Confirmed deaths
Confirmed cases

0 deaths
1+ death
5+ death
10+ deaths

500+ cases
50+ cases
5+ cases
1+ cases

Two people who had arrived in Brazil from Mexico with symptoms of an undefined illness were hospitalized in São Paulo on 25 April. It was initially suspected that they had the swine flu virus. The Brazilian Ministry of Health later issued a press release stating that while the exact cause of the two patients illnesses remained unknown, they "did not meet the definition of suspected cases of swine influenza because they did not have signs and symptoms consistent with the disease: fever over 39 °C, accompanied by coughing and/or a headache, muscle and joint pain."

The press release also stated that airports would monitor travelers arriving from affected areas, under the direction of the National Sanitary Surveillance Agency (ANVISA). Air crews were trained on signs and symptoms of swine influenza so that passengers displaying symptoms would receive guidance from ANVISA upon arrival.

On 30 May, the Minister said that the country has 20 confirmed cases, 8 in São Paulo, 5 in Rio de Janeiro, 4 in Santa Catarina, 1 in Minas Gerais, 1 in Rio Grande do Sul and 1 in Tocantins. Three of the 5 cases in Rio are of transmission inside the country and two of the four in Santa Catarina are two.

On 2, 3 June more cases were confirmed, one in São Paulo and two in Rio de Janeiro, increasing the number of cases to 23.

On 4 June, the number of confirmed cases increase to 28 with another 3 in São Paulo and 2 in Mato Grosso do Sul.

On 19 June, the total number of confirmed cases was 131, being 55 in São Paulo, 26 in Santa Catarina, 19 in Minas Gerais, 15 in Rio de Janeiro, 4 in Tocantins, 3 in Distrito Federal, 2 in Espírito Santo, 2 in Goiás, 2 in Mato Grosso, 1 in Bahia, 1 in Rio Grande do Norte and 1 in Rio Grande do Sul.

On 6 August, the total number of confirmed cases was 10,894, the suspect cases was 200,000 and the deaths was 140.

On 26 August, Brazil is the country with the bigger number of deaths, surpassing even USA and Mexico, with 557 deaths.

=== Chile ===
Outbreak evolution in Chile: Confirmed cases followed by death Confirmed cases Unconfirmed or suspected cases

Outbreak evolution in Chile: Confirmed Cases 50+ cases 5+ cases 1+ cases no cases

On 27 April, the Assistant Secretary of Health Jeanette Vega, confirmed that there are eight suspected cases of swine influenza in the country, which are being examined at the Hospital del Tórax in Santiago. Five other cases have been dismissed by the authorities.

On 28 April the Health Ministry announced 26 cases under investigation: 16 in Santiago; 2 in Atacama; 2 in Valparaíso; 4 in O'Higgins Region; 1 in Biobío and 1 in Araucanía. 16 other cases have been dismissed.

On 1 May, the Health Ministry announced that it continued to investigate 4 suspected cases: 2 in Santiago, 1 in Valparaíso and 1 in Araucanía. To date, 80 suspected cases have been examined by the Health Ministry; 76 of those have been dismissed. Another suspected case was identified on 2 May, bringing the number of cases under investigation to 5.

On 10 May, the Health Ministry announced that 116 cases have been dismissed, and there are no cases pending test results.

On 17 May, the Chilean Health Minister confirmed, the first case of A(H1N1) flu in Chile, the same day two more cases were confirmed.

On 29 May, the Chilean Health ministry confirmed the number of cases of A-H1N1 had risen to 224, the same day two more cases were confirmed.

On 3 June Chile had its first confirmed death of swine flu. A 37-year-old man from Puerto Montt.

On 9 June, the Ministry confirmed the number of cases had risen to 1694 and the number of deaths to 2. In this report, the minister stated that 1.7% of the cases have required hospitalization, 0.12% have resulted in death, 35.3% are being isolated in their residences while the remaining 63% are said to be in full recovery.

On 12 June, the Ministry confirmed the number of cases had risen to 2335. In the report, the minister stated that 2.4% of the cases have required hospitalization, 0.08% (2 cases) have resulted in death, 53% of the cases are men and 66% is from 5 to 19 years old.

=== Colombia ===
H1N1 in Colombia Confirmed cases followed by death Confirmed cases Unconfirmed or suspected cases

H1N1 in Colombia: Confirmed Cases 50+ cases 5+ cases 1+ cases no cases

The Minister of Social Protection, Diego Palacio Betancourt, announced on 26 April 2009, that 12 suspect cases had been detected, 9 in Bogotá and 3 on the Caribbean coast. Samples of the virus have been sent to the US for comparisons and analysis. Results of the testing were expected within few days. On 27 April, the Government declared a "national disaster" state in order to face the emergency, which allowed health authorities to have a special budget to do so. As of 28 April, most of the suspect cases were excluded, with only four remaining: three Mexican teachers in Bogotá, and one person in Cartagena. Another 38 suspect cases were under observation. On 29 April, the suspect cases raised to 49, with 10 of them "highly" suspect. The government purchased 400,000 oseltamivir(Tamiflu) doses, which will be distributed through the Social Protection ministry to the affected if there are confirmed cases.

On 3 May 2009, Minister Palacio confirmed the first case of A(H1N1) in Colombia, in a 42-year-old person from Zipaquirá, who recently travelled to Mexico. According to Palacio, only one out of 18 tests sent to Atlanta was positive. The patient was isolated and put under medical treatment. On the same day, Palacio stated there were 108 suspect cases in the country. On 9 June, first death of H1N1 was confirmed. Ten days later, a local newspaper El Tiempo announced a new death on Bogota, reported at 21 June. On 17 July, El Tiempo reported the first death of swine flu outside of Cundinamarca, which is also the seventh in all of Colombia.

On 30 August 2009, El Tiempo reported that president Álvaro Uribe had contracted the AH1N1 flu virus, becoming the second head of state to do so (the first being Óscar Arias).

=== Ecuador ===
Outbreak evolution in Ecuador: Confirmed cases Unconfirmed or suspected cases

Health officials are carrying out checks on people with flu symptoms entering the country from sea or air. On 29 April, Ecuador closed its borders to Mexican citizens and foreigners of other nationalities arriving from Mexico for a period of 30 days. On 15 May, Health officials confirmed the first case of AH1N1 flu in Ecuador. On 20 May, the Health Department confirmed 7 more new cases of AH1N1, raising the total number of infected people to 8, the number has now risen to 41.

=== Paraguay ===
Outbreak evolution in Paraguay: Confirmed cases Unconfirmed or suspected cases

On 1 June, the Minister of Health confirmed the first 5 cases in the country but stated that the situation was under control.

On 8 June, twenty more cases were confirmed by the Ministry of Health raising the total number to 25.

On 21 July 195 cases were confirmed by the Ministry of Health and 13 deaths.

On 8 August, the total number of confirmed cases was 244, the estimated cases was 3.629 and 27 deaths.

=== Peru ===
Outbreak evolution in Peru: Confirmed cases Unconfirmed or suspected cases

The Governor of Callao, Alex Kouri, ordered that all passengers from any infected country, mainly Mexico, Canada and US, must be checked before their arrival on Peruvian territory. Also, the Peruvian government must be warned of any case or symptom of fever. This step is in order to prevent any infections, since the main port and airport of Peru are located in Callao. Also, the government has prepared a special area at the Hospital "Daniel Alcides Carrión" to treat cases of this disease.

The first suspicious case has been detected in the morning of 27 April 2009. It was a Peruvian woman who returned from Mexico.

In Peru 5 people were considered suspects with the virus, but as of 28 April have been confirmed to be healthy and not carrying the H1N1 virus. The government has stated that the country is clean, but efforts are being made to examine slaughterhouses and they are screening incoming passengers from problem areas.

On 29 April, Peru's Health Minister Oscar Ugarte confirmed one case of swine flu. On 30 April, he said the case is not entirely confirmed. Having recently visited Mexico, the patient was flying in a Copa Airlines airplane from Panama to Buenos Aires on 28 April, but the flight was diverted to Lima due to her illness. The crew only notified of the suspicion of swine flu only after the passenger had checked in the airport. Three more suspected cases were being investigated. Ugarte also announced the suspension of all commercial flights from Mexico to Peru. On 14 May, Ugarte totally confirmed a case of swine flu from a Peruvian woman who returned from New York, plus another suspected case in Trujillo from another woman in the same flight. On 17 May, the second case was confirmed, an American born man residing in Arequipa. He had returned from the US on 12 May, not showing any symptoms until two days later.

On 18 May a new case was confirmed, a scholar returning from a trip to Dominican Republic, that studied in the Altair school. Classes for her class in that school had been suspended until 25 May. 19 May, another case of a scholar from the same trip to Dominican Republic. Student had contact with 3rd case and both studied in the same school.

=== Suriname ===
On 15 June, the first case of flu was confirmed in Suriname. On 25, 13 June more cases were confirmed. As of 12, 18 August cases are confirmed in Suriname.

=== Uruguay ===
Outbreak evolution in Uruguay: Confirmed cases Unconfirmed or suspected cases No cases

Uruguay confirmed its first two cases on 27 May in a 27-year-old man and a 15-year woman who recently arrived from Argentina.

On 8 June, two private schools in Montevideo were closed in order to prevent an increase in the number of infected people.

On 11 June, the number of cases on Uruguay increased to 36.

As of 12 June, the Ministry of Health won't give anymore information about new cases, since the flu has entered into a pandemic phase, arguing that it's no longer needed. However, they will start studying possible outbreaks inside the country. To date, there are 1500 suspected cases.

On 29 June, the first death due to A H1N1 Influenza happens.

As of 6 July, the Ministry of Health confirmed 195 cases present in the country and 4 deaths.

On 14 July the Ministry of Health confirmed 15 deaths as caused by this flu.

=== Venezuela ===
Outbreak evolution in Venezuela: Unconfirmed or suspected cases

Controls have been raised at airports to prevent contagion from spreading. Travellers from the United States and Mexico with flu symptoms are being isolated until they are given the all clear. Pig farms in the country are being "closely inspected" and stockpiles of medicines built up.

On 28 May the Health Minister, Jesús Mantilla, confirmed the first case of the A/H1N1 flu in a Venezuelan citizen who arrived in a flight from Panama four days ago. He was isolated to the place he is receiving treatment and his condition is stable. The following day, a second case was confirmed from another person who also arrived from the same flight.

On 1 June another case was tested positive and was also linked to the previous two cases.

On 3 June a fourth case was confirmed from a male citizen who arrived from Brazil. The Minister of Health confirmed that all the patients are stable and there is no need to alarm the population.

On 8 June, the number of confirmed cases increased to 12 also from citizens who arrived from Panama, France and the United States. Later that day a 13th case was confirmed, this time a 9-year-old boy who recently came from Colombia.

On 9 June, one more case was confirmed again in the Andean region.

On 14 June, The number of Venezuelans infected with the virus AH1N1 rose to 44 this day, reported in statements to the Bolivarian News Agency (ABN) the Deputy Minister of Health Networks of the Ministry of People's Power for Health Nancy Perez. In this way, 44 cases of the virus AH1N1 in the country are divided into the following Federal Entities: 17 Miranda, Anzoategui 10; Táchira 4 Aragua 4; Mérida 2; Vargas 2; Bolivar 2; Zulia 1; Carabobo 1 and Nueva Esparta 1.

On 18 July, the first death by the virus was confirmed.

== Timeline ==
2009	A(H1N1) Outbreak and Pandemic Milestones in South America
3 May	First case confirmed in Colombia. (first in South America)
7 May	First case confirmed in Argentina.
7 May	First case confirmed in Brazil.
14 May	First case confirmed in Peru.
15 May	First case confirmed in Ecuador.
17 May	First case confirmed in Chile.
19 May	First case confirmed in Paraguay.
27 May	First case confirmed in Uruguay.
28 May	First case confirmed in Bolivia.
28 May	First case confirmed in Venezuela.
28 May	Community outbreaks confirmed in Argentina.
30 May	Community outbreaks confirmed in Chile.
2 June	First death confirmed in Chile.
9 June	First death confirmed in Colombia.
12 June	Community outbreaks confirmed in Uruguay.
15 June	First death confirmed in Argentina.
16 June	First case confirmed in Suriname.
20 June	Community outbreaks confirmed in Venezuela.
25 June	First human-to-animal transmission of the virus in Argentina.
28 June	First death confirmed in Brazil.
29 June	First death confirmed in Uruguay.
30 June	First case of Oseltamivir (Tamiflu) resistance found in Chile.
1 July	First death confirmed in Paraguay.
5 July	First death confirmed in Peru.
7 July	First case confirmed in Guyana.
10 July	First death confirmed in Ecuador.
10 July	First death confirmed in Bolivia.
16 July	Community outbreaks confirmed in Brazil.
16 July	Community outbreaks confirmed in Colombia.
18 July	First death confirmed in Venezuela.
22 July	Community outbreaks confirmed in Peru.
23 July	Community outbreaks confirmed in Bolivia.
24 July	First case confirmed in Falkland Islands.
25 July	Community outbreaks confirmed in Ecuador.
26 July	Community outbreaks confirmed in Paraguay.
28 July	First case of Oseltamivir (Tamiflu) resistance found in Argentina.
31 July	(France) First case confirmed in French Guiana.
31 July	First case of zoonosis in Brazil, where an infected pig infects a human.
12 August	First case of Oseltamivir (Tamiflu) resistance found in Brazil.
15 August	First case of Oseltamivir (Tamiflu) resistance found in Peru.
21 August	First case in birds confirmed in Chile.
26 August	First human-to-animal transmission of the virus in Brazil.
28 August	First case in birds confirmed in Brazil.
8 September	First death confirmed in Suriname.
8 September	(France) First death confirmed in French Guiana.
3 November	First cases in ferrets confirmed in Brazil.
12 November	First feline zoonosis confirmed in Brazil.
19 November	First death confirmed in Falkland Islands.
28 November	First mutation (D222G) confirmed in Brazil.
30 November	First double infection case confirmed in Brazil.
3 December	First canine zoonosis confirmed in Brazil.
20 December	First completed clinical trials by a company for 2009/H1N1 vaccine in Brazil.
5 January 2010	Mass vaccinations in Brazil begins.
15 January 2010	Mass vaccinations in Peru begins.
