= 2009 swine flu pandemic in Germany =

The 2009 flu pandemic, involving an outbreak of a new strain of influenza commonly known as swine flu, reached Germany in April 2009.

Outbreak evolution in Germany: 500+ cases 50+ cases 5+ cases

Two men and a woman from Bielefeld who had been firstly suspected of having the virus tested negative on influenza type A.

On 29 April, the first case of swine flu in Germany was confirmed by the Robert Koch Institute in the area of Regensburg. A 22-year-old woman from Hamburg is also confirmed to have been infected by swine flu during a trip to Mexico. A 37-year-old woman from Kulmbach is also confirmed to have become infected during a similar trip.

On 1 May, the Robert Koch Institute confirmed the first case of human-to-human transmission of swine flu in Munich. A nurse who had contact with one of the infected people was infected with the virus. At approximately 10:00 she was claimed to be already healed. At 13:00 one additional infection in Bavaria was confirmed, but the patient was also claimed to be healthy again.

On 2 May, a new human-to-human infection, in the same hospital in Munich, was confirmed. The new patient, who was in the same room with the original infected German that came from Mexico, is currently being reported to show no signs of the new influenza strain anymore.

On 3 May, two further cases of swine flu in Brandenburg were reported. Two people from the same flight as patient in Hamburg were also infected.

On 5 May, one new case in Saxony-Anhalt has been confirmed bringing to 9 the total number of people infected.

On 7 May, another new case in Saxony-Anhalt is reported.

On 8 May, an adult male living in Bavaria who had recently been to United States.

On 11 May, the case of a 27-year-old Bavarian woman, who stayed for some weeks in Mexico and medicated patients in a hospital, is reported.

On 15 May, two more cases were reported, a female and her son from Saxony-Anhalt were obviously infected by her husband / his father, who returned from Mexico.

On 21 May, a case was found in a 43-year-old woman from Düsseldorf in North Rhine-Westphalia who returned from New York. One day later, Robert Koch Institute confirmed that her husband has been tested positive with swine influenza too. Furthermore, their six-year-old daughter, who did not stay in New York, has been infected by her parents, bringing the total to 17.

Until 5 June 2009, the total number of confirmed cases increased to 49. Most of them have been recent travellers to Mexico, the US or the UK. However, there was also a single-digit number of (isolated) in-country-transmissions.

As of 6 November 2009, the number of infections increased to 29,900 with nine deaths caused by the flu.

Confirmed cases in Germany by states as of 17 Nov
State	Confirmed cases	Confirmed cases followed by death
Bavaria	25,280	11
North Rhine-Westphalia	15,769	11
Baden-Württemberg	10,258	2
Lower Saxony	10,205	1
Rhineland-Palatinate	5,027	1
Hesse	4,130	1
Saxony	2,182	1
Thuringia	2,113	0
Saxony-Anhalt	2,050	0
Hamburg	2,034	0
Berlin	1,580	1
Schleswig-Holstein	1,476	0
Brandenburg	1,040	0
Bremen	866	0
Mecklenburg-Vorpommern	680	0
Saarland	600	1
Total	85,290	30
