= Félix Mantilla =

Félix Mantilla may refer to:

- Félix Mantilla (tennis) (born 1974), Spanish tennis player
- Félix Mantilla (baseball) (1934–2025), Puerto Rican Major League Baseball player
