= 2009 swine flu pandemic in Brazil =

- Map of the outbreak in Brazil by confirmed cases

- Map of the outbreak in Brazil by confirmed deaths
- Disease: Swine flu
- Pathogen: H1N1/09 virus
- Location: Brazil
- First outbreak: La Gloria, Veracruz, Mexico
- Index case: Rio de Janeiro
- Arrival date: April 25, 2009 (17 years, 6 months and 4 days)
- Confirmed cases: 59,867
- Deaths: 2,146
- Fatality rate: 3.58%

The 2009 swine flu pandemic spread to Brazil on April 25, 2009, with two people, spreading to 34 over the first two weeks. CDC calculate that Africa and Southeast Asia, which have 38% of the world's population, accounted for a disproportionate 51% of the deaths.

Two people who had arrived in Brazil from Mexico with symptoms of an undefined illness were hospitalized in São Paulo on April 25. It was initially suspected that they had the swine flu virus. The Brazilian Ministry of Health later issued a press release stating that while the exact cause of the two patients illnesses remained unknown, they "did not meet the definition of suspected cases of swine influenza because they did not have signs and symptoms consistent with the disease: fever over 39 °C, accompanied by coughing and/or a headache, muscle and joint pain."

The press release also stated that airports would monitor travelers arriving from affected areas, under the direction of the National Sanitary Surveillance Agency (ANVISA). Air crews are also being trained on signs and symptoms of swine influenza so that passengers displaying symptoms may receive guidance from ANVISA upon arrival.

Confirmed deaths Confirmed cases

Community Outbreaks Unconfirmed Outbreaks

1+ cases 5+ cases 50+ cases 500+ cases 5000+ cases

0 deaths 1+ death 5+ deaths 10+ deaths 100+ deaths

== Totals ==
Cases by state
States	Cases		Deaths
States	Laboratory confirmed	Suspected Cases	Confirmed (Suspected)f
Totals	(58,178)	1,193,000	1,705
Acre	122		4
Alagoas	22		0
Amazonas	95		3
Amapá	12		0
Bahia	203		14
Ceará	70		0
Distrito Federal	626		10
Espírito Santo	87		9
Goiás	376		73
Maranhão	30		0
Mato Grosso	125		24
Mato Grosso do Sul	73		18
Minas Gerais	691		113
Pará	320		7
Paraíba	19		2
Paraná	45,444	250,000	286
Pernambuco	126	3000	5
Piauí	167		1
Rio de Janeiro	(839)		134
Rio Grande do Norte	70		8
Rio Grande do Sul	(1,553)	530,000	208
Rondônia	34		1
Roraima	12		2
Santa Catarina	1,128		113
São Paulo	(5,875)	400,000	530
Sergipe	19		0
Tocantins	40		3

== Timeline ==
=== May ===
On May 7, the first four cases of swine flu were confirmed, two of them in São Paulo state, one of them in Rio de Janeiro state and one in Minas Gerais. Three of the infected patients were recently in Mexico and the other was recently in the United States.

On May 8, another case of swine flu was confirmed, this time in Santa Catarina state. The infected patient was a girl of seven years old, she was recently in the United States. The country has another 30 suspected cases. That same day, the sixth case of swine flu was confirmed in Brazil. This case was from Rio de Janeiro state. This was the first confirmed case of transmission inside the country. However, the infected person only had contact with an infected patient and is now under observation and being cured. On May 9, besides the confirmed cases, the health ministry confirmed the existence of 30 suspected cases in the country: São Paulo (12), Paraná (4), Minas Gerais (4), Distrito Federal (2), Goiás (2), Santa Catarina (1), Mato Grosso do Sul (1), Pernambuco (1), Ceará (1), Rondônia (1) and Rio de Janeiro (1). The two new cases are each at Rio Grande do Sul and Rio de Janeiro.

On May 10, the health ministry informed that the suspected cases in Brazil fell to 18. They are located in São Paulo (6), Rio de Janeiro (2), Minas Gerais (1), Paraná (1), Distrito Federal (3), Santa Catarina (1), Pernambuco (2), Ceará (1) e Rondônia (1). Today in Brazil, the flight with the friends of the first infected man in Rio arrived, probably with this flight more suspected in Rio de Janeiro will confirmed.

On May 10, in the night, the minister of health confirmed two more cases of swine flu, another case in Rio de Janeiro, this patient catch the flu of the others two patients of the Rio. And the first in Rio Grande do Sul, this patient was in several European countries (Germany, Czech Republic, Hungary, Austria, Italy and Spain), before returning to Brazil. As outlined the Ministry of Health, the patient of Rio Grande do Sul is well and showed the first symptoms, light, on May 3 in Italy. Now the country has 8 confirmed cases and 22 suspected cases. The suspected cases are in São Paulo (10), Rio de Janeiro (2), Paraná (1), Distrito Federal (3), Alagoas (1), Pernambuco (3), Ceará (1) e Rondônia (1).

On May 11, the Minister of Health confirmed the existence of 34 suspected cases in Brazil. They are in São Paulo (14), Distrito Federal (4), Rio de Janeiro (4), Alagoas(2), Minas Gerais (2), Paraná (2), Pernambuco (2), Ceará (1) and Rondônia (1). Today confirmed too that the woman with the swine flu in Rio is with pneumonia, but her state is stable.

On May 13, the Minister of Health confirmed the existence of 37 suspected cases in Brazil. They are in São Paulo (14), Distrito Federal (4), Rio de Janeiro (3), Alagoas(2), Minas Gerais (7), Pernambuco (3), Ceará (1), Pará (1), Rio Grande do Sul (1) and Rondônia (1).

On May 27, the Minister of Health confirmed the existence of more two confirmed cases of swine flu in Brazil, they are in São Paulo and Rio de Janeiro. Both cases are patients who had recently in USA. They two pass well.

On May 28, there are more four confirmed cases in the country, one in Santa Catarina and the others three in São Paulo. Both cases came from USA. And they pass well, one of the cases in São Paulo is a boy with 16 years old, the others three are in adults.

On May 29, the Minister of Health confirmed the fifteenth case in Brazil, that one in Rio de Janeiro, and it's the third case by transmission inside the country.

On May 30, the more 5 cases were confirmed, the first in Tocantins, that patient contracted the flu in USA. More two in São Paulo, the both contracted in USA too. And more two in Santa Catarina, but in this time that two contracted the flu in Brazil, these are the 4th and the 5th cases with contracted inside the country in Brazil.

=== June ===
On June 2, another 3 cases were confirmed, two in Rio de Janeiro and one in São Paulo, the case from São Paulo is by a person who contracted the flu inside the country. On June 3, another 3 cases in São Paulo were confirmed. On June 4, two first cases in Mato Grosso were confirmed. Now the country has 28 confirmed cases and 44 suspected cases.

On June 5, the number of cases increases to 31 with new 3 confirmed cases in the country. One in Santa Catarina, this contracted the flu inside the country and one in Tocantins and one in São Paulo.

On June 6, more 4 cases were confirmed, more two in São Paulo, more one in Rio de Janeiro and another in Tocantins. The patient of Tocantins and one of the patients of São Paulo had transmission inside the country.

On June 7, another case was confirmed. The patient is from Rio de Janeiro and he contracted the flu in Canada. Now are 36 confirmed cases and 45 suspected cases.

On June 8, the minister of Health confirmed two other new cases of swine flu. The both in São Paulo, now the country has 38 confirmed cases.

On June 9, the minister confirmed more two cases of swine flu in the country. Another in Santa Catarina and the first in Distrito Federal. Now the country has 40 confirmed cases and 49 suspect cases.

On June 10, the Minister of Health confirmed another 3 cases of swine flu in São Paulo. Another 2 in Santa Catarina, the both contracted the flu inside the country and 1 in São Paulo, that contracted the flu in USA. Now are 43 confirmed cases.

On June 11, after the WHO elevate a pandemic the swine flu outbreak, the Minister of Health confirmed more 9 cases in the country: 2 in São Paulo, 1 in Rio de Janeiro, 2 in Santa Catarina, 3 in Minas Gerais and 1 in Tocantins. Now there are 52 cases in Brazil.

On June 12, 3 new cases were confirmed by the Minister of Health, 1 in Minas Gerais, 1 in Distrito Federal and 1 in Bahia, the last is the first confirmed case in the Northeast Region, Brazil, and the 55th in the country.

On June 13, 3 new cases were confirmed by the Minister of Health, the 3 are in São Paulo. Two of them contracted the flu inside the country. In that same day, a flight of Florianópolis was stopped for more than two hours, because a woman passenger had swine flu symptoms. The state of Santa Catarina monitors 30 students who returned from a trip to Argentina.

On June 14, 11 more were confirmed in Brazil by the Minister of Health. 7 of them in Santa Catarina and 4 in Minas Gerais. The number of cases increase to 69 and the country has 70 suspected cases. Despite this, the Minister said the transmission in Brazil are not strong.

On June 15, 5 more cases were confirmed, increasing the number of confirmed cases to 74. 4 of them in São Paulo and one in Distrito Federal. The number of suspected cases is 79. Despite this, there are not serious cases in Brazil, nor cases with risk of fatality.

On June 16, 5 more cases were confirmed, 2 in Santa Catarina, 2 in Minas Gerais and 1 in Rio de Janeiro. This increases the number of cases to 79. The number of suspected cases are 96.

On June 17, 17 more cases were confirmed by Minister of Health. 7 of them in São Paulo, 5 in Santa Catarina, 3 in Minas Gerais and 2 in Rio de Janeiro. The Adolf Lutz Institute managed to isolate the virus and discover that the virus in Brazil has a slightly different genetic sequencing of the United States, one has a mutation. This action can help in the production of vaccine against the virus.

On June 18, 18 more cases were confirmed by the Minister of Health. 7 of them in São Paulo, 5 in Minas Gerais, 2 in Santa Catarina, 2 in Rio de Janeiro and the first 2 infections in Espírito Santo.

On June 19, 17 more cases were confirmed. 14 of them in São Paulo state, the first 2 in Goiás, and the first in Rio Grande do Norte. The Minister of Health confirmed that beyond the 131 confirmed cases, the country has yet 166 suspected cases.

On June 20, 49 more cases were confirmed by the Minister of Health. It's a record of confirmations in just one day. 25 of the confirmed cases are in São Paulo, 11 in Rio de Janeiro, 7 in Distrito Federal, 2 in Rio Grande do Sul, 1 in Bahia, 1 in Minas Gerais and the first two cases in Paraná. The number of cases in Brazil tripled in just seven days. Now there are 180 confirmed cases and another 184 cases are suspected.

On June 21, 35 more cases were confirmed: 15 of them in São Paulo (now this state alone has almost 100 cases), 4 in Minas Gerais, 4 in Rio de Janeiro, 4 in Rio Grande do Sul, 3 in Santa Catarina, 1 in Distrito Federal, 1 in Espírito Santo, 1 in Mato Grosso, 1 in Paraná and the first case in Alagoas.

On June 22, 25 more cases were confirmed, which increases the number of cases to 240: 15 of them in São Paulo, 3 in Espírito Santo, 3 in Santa Catarina, 2 in Distrito Federal, 1 in Minas Gerais and the first case in Maranhão.

On June 23, 94 more cases were confirmed. It's a record of confirmations in just one day. 50 of them in São Paulo, now this state has alone 160 confirmed cases. 17 in Minas Gerais, 13 in Rio de Janeiro, 4 in Santa Catarina, 2 in Bahia, 2 in Espírito Santo, 2 in Paraná, 1 in Alagoas, 1 in Goiás, 1 in Rio Grande do Sul and the first in Sergipe. Today, the Vale (mining company) closes the 30th floor of a building in Rio de Janeiro with the confirmation that one of the worker has swine flu, 90 another workers are in quarantined in their homes and on observation, because they had contact with the official with swine flu. In Brazil, 4 schools anticipated the holidays with the confirmation of one case of swine flu in each, 3 of them are of São Paulo and the other is in Minas Gerais. A university in São Paulo closes too. In São Gabriel, Rio Grande do Sul, the mayor declared a state of emergency, because probably 17 people who live in the city has swine flu and contracted in Brazil, for now just one case are confirmed. The Minister of Health decided to alert the public to defer travel to United States, Mexico, Australia, Chile and Argentina, most of the cases of Brazil came from those countries. 2 persons in Rio Grande do Sul are in serious situation, one of that people is a girl of 14 years.

On June 24, 66 more cases were confirmed by the Minister of Health: 26 of them in São Paulo, 11 in Minas Gerais, 9 in Rio Grande do Sul, 4 in Paraná, 4 in Santa Catarina, 3 in Rio de Janeiro, 3 in Sergipe, 2 in Alagoas, 1 in Bahia, the first two cases in Paraíba and the first one in Pernambuco. Now the number of confirmed cases is 400 and 310 are considered suspected.

On June 25, more 53 cases were confirmed. 31 of them in São Paulo, 11 in Rio Grande do Sul, 7 in Minas Gerais, 2 in Rio de Janeiro, 1 in Distrito Federal, 1 in Goiás and the first in Ceará.

On June 26, more 70 cases were confirmed. 43 of them in São Paulo, 6 in Minas Gerais, 5 in Paraná, 5 in Distrito Federal, 4 in Rio de Janeiro, 3 in Santa Catarina, 1 in Espírito Santo, the 2 first cases in Piauí and the first 1 in Pará. In an interview, the Minister of Health said "We have a big increase in the number of cases in the next days." The minister attributed this view to the arrival of winter, the growing number of cases in the world and the beginning of the holiday. But again emphasized that the situation of Brazil and tranquility. "It is a disease with the same severity of influenza that we have every year." Minister Jose Gomes Temporão also said that three measures will be taken by the government for greater control of influenza A (H1N1) in Brazil. The first is that the medicine to combat the disease will only be used in patients with worsening health in the first 48 hours since the initial presentation of symptoms, and people at risk of presenting a serious clinical - as children up to two years, people over 60 years, pregnant women and those who are immunosuppressed. The objective of the initiative is to prevent the misuse of the product and prevent viruses that create resistance to the medication, which today is considered effective. The ministry will also guide states and municipalities with basic parameters on the suspension or not of activities in public places or groups. In evaluating the ministry, for lack of parameters, there indecision that could have been avoided and that the evaluation of Mantega would have caused an unnecessary panic. In Brazil, 65% of the cases contracted the flu outside the country and just 26% contracted inside.

On June 27, 69 more cases were confirmed: 34 of them in São Paulo, 8 in Rio de Janeiro, 7 in Rio Grande do Sul, 7 in Paraná, 4 in Minas Gerais, 2 in Distrito Federal, 2 in Santa Catarina, 2 in Espírito Santo, 1 in Pará, 1 in Maranhão and the first in Amazonas. An American tourist with suspected of swine flu died in Rio Grande do Sul, he was an engineer and had 58 years old. He was hypertensive and diabetic. The doctors collected material to confirm if he had or not swine flu. He can be the first fatal victim in Brazil.

On June 28, 36 more new cases were confirmed by the Minister of Health: 14 of them in São Paulo, 6 in Rio de Janeiro, 5 in Rio Grande do Sul, 5 in Distrito Federal, 3 in Pernambuco, 2 in Goiás and 1 in Tocantins. The first death was confirmed: a 29-year-old truck driver who lived in Rio Grande do Sul and had recently been in Argentina.

On June 29 and 30, 55 more new cases were confirmed: 45 of them in Rio Grande do Sul, 3 in Piauí, 3 in Santa Catarina, 1 in Alagoas, 1 in Distrito Federal, 1 in Paraná and 1 in Sergipe. Now the number of confirmed cases increases to 680.

=== July ===
On July 1, 13 more cases were confirmed: 5 of them in Rio Grande do Sul, 4 in São Paulo, 3 in Minas Gerais and 1 in Rio de Janeiro. This increases the number of confirmed cases to 694. For the first time the number of suspected cases are more than 1,000. With that the Minister of Health believes that the number of confirmed cases is growing too fast.

On July 2, 44 more cases were confirmed: 14 of them in Rio de Janeiro, 9 in Rio Grande do Sul, 8 in Minas Gerais, 6 in São Paulo, 3 in Distrito Federal, 2 in Santa Catarina and 2 in Paraná. Now the number of confirmed cases is 737.

On July 3, more 19 cases were confirmed: 7 of them in São Paulo, 6 in Minas Gerais, 2 in Rio de Janeiro, 2 in Rio Grande do Sul, 1 in Paraná and the first in Mato Grosso do Sul.

On July 4, more 56 cases were confirmed. 13 of them in São Paulo, 8 in Rio de Janeiro, 6 in Minas Gerais, 6 in Paraná, 4 in Bahia, 4 in Mato Grosso do Sul, 4 in Pernambuco, 3 in Ceará, 3 in Santa Catarina, 1 in Distrito Federal, 1 in Goiás, 1 in Mato Grosso, 1 in Rio Grande do Sul and the first in Amapá. The number of confirmed cases increases to 812.

On July 5, more 73 cases were confirmed. 61 of them in São Paulo, 4 in Pernambuco, 2 in Paraíba, 2 in Rio Grande do Sul, 2 in Santa Catarina, 1 in Ceará and 1 in Rio Grande do Norte. The number of confirmed cases increases to 885.

On July 6, more 20 cases were confirmed. 7 of them in Rio Grande do Sul, 6 in Paraná, 3 in Goiás, 3 in São Paulo and 1 in Rio Grande do Norte. The number of confirmed cases increases to 905.

On July 8, more 72 cases were confirmed. 42 of them in São Paulo, 11 in Rio de Janeiro, 7 in Rio Grande do Sul, 3 in Bahia, 2 in Maranhão, 2 in Pernambuco, 1 in Ceará, 1 in Paraná, 1 in Paraíba, 1 in Rio Grande do Norte and the first in Acre.

On July 10, more 52 cases were confirmed. 13 of them in São Paulo, 11 in Minas Gerais, 11 in Rio Grande do Sul, 9 in Rio de Janeiro, 3 in Pará, 3 in Tocantins, 1 in Alagoas and 1 in Pernambuco. The number of confirmed cases increases to 1,027 and the number of suspected increase to 2,973. Today the second death was confirmed in Brazil. The victim was an 11-year-old girl who lived in São Paulo; she died 2 days after presenting symptoms.

On July 15, more 148 cases were confirmed. It's a record of confirmation, most of them in São Paulo, now the state has more than 500 cases of swine flu. The country has 1,175 confirmed cases and 3,956 suspected. 9 more deaths were of confirmed in that day, 2 of them in São Paulo, 6 in Rio Grande do Sul and the first in Rio de Janeiro. On July 16, the minister of Health José Gomes Temporão confirmed the outbreak, confirmed that the virus circulates freely in Brazil.

On July 19, 4 more deaths were confirmed, both in Rio Grande do Sul. The minister estimates that just in Rio Grande do Sul 3,000 people can be with the swine flu.

On July 21, 7 more deaths were confirmed. Six of them were in São Paulo and the first in Paraná. On June 22, more 7 deaths were confirmed and increase the number of confirmed deaths to 29.

=== August ===
On August 17, the students in public schools return to classes after two weeks, because of the swine flu. Every single school in São Paulo now got liquid alcohol and liquid soap. For now, there's no confirmed new cases after this happen, which is expected, once Brazilian government says only "critical cases" will be tested for H1N1; officially, there's no intent to count the cases, but to offer treatment to infected people.

On August 26, Minister of Health reported 557 deaths by swine flu in the country. this announcement led Brazil to surpass United States in numbers of deaths by swine flu and to become the country with the most deaths from swine flu in the world.
