= Ángeles Mantilla =

Mexican chemical engineer

María de los Ángeles Mantilla Ramírez is a Mexican chemical engineer whose research involves photochemistry, photocatalysis, and nanomaterials, particularly for water treatment applications. She is a professor and researcher in CICATA Querétaro, the Research Center for Applied Science and Advance Technology of the Instituto Politécnico Nacional.

== Education and career ==
Mantilla studied chemical engineering at the Universidad Veracruzana, earning a degree in 1990. She went to the National Autonomous University of Mexico (UNAM) for graduate study, earning a master's degree in industrial administration in 1996. in 2005 she earned a second master's degree in materials science through UAM Azcapotzalco. She completed her Ph.D. in 2010, at CICATA.

After working as a researcher for the Mexican Petroleum Institute from 1991 to 2004, and as a visiting professor at UAM Azcapotzalco in 2007–2008, she took her present position at CICATA in 2011.

== Recognition ==
Mantilla is a member of the Mexican Academy of Sciences.
