= 2009 swine flu pandemic in Africa =

The 2009 flu pandemic hit Africa two months later than other continents with the first case reported in Egypt on June 2, 2009. As of December 1, 30 countries in Africa had reported cases and 7 countries in Africa had reported a total of 108 deaths. It was the least affected continent.

Symptoms of H1N1 swine flu are like regular flu symptoms and include fever, cough, sore throat, runny nose, body aches, headache, chills, and fatigue. Many people with swine flu have had diarrhea and vomiting, but these symptoms can also be caused by many other conditions. That means that you and your doctor can't know, just based on your symptoms, if you've got swine flu. Healthcare professionals may offer a rapid flu test, although a negative result doesn't mean you don't have the flu. The accuracy of the test depends on the quality of the manufacturer's test, the sample collection method, and how much of the virus a person is emitting at the time of testing.

Like seasonal flu, pandemic swine flu can cause neurological symptoms in children. These events are rare, but, as cases associated with seasonal flu have shown, they can be very severe and often fatal. Symptoms include seizures or changes in mental status (confusion or sudden cognitive or behavioral changes). It's not clear why these symptoms occur, although they may be caused by Reye's syndrome. Reye's syndrome usually occurs in children with a viral illness who have taken aspirin—something that should always be avoided.

Detected human cases in African countries
Country	Cases	Deaths
Country	Laboratory confirmed	Laboratory confirmed
Total	28,616	345
South Africa	12,631	93
Egypt	11,765	210
Morocco	2980	50
Algeria	672	47
Mauritius	69	8
Tunisia	1200	18
Madagascar	877	3
Mozambique	101	2
São Tomé and Príncipe	41	2
Nigeria	11	2
Tanzania	677	1
Libya	233	1
Namibia	72	1
Sudan	145	5
Kenya	417	0
Rwanda	331	0
Uganda	251	0
Zambia	90	0
Democratic Republic of Congo	222	0
Lesotho	65	0
Cape Verde	62	0
Ghana	54	0
Zimbabwe	41	0
Angola	37	0
Seychelles	33	0
Botswana	23	0
Republic of the Congo	21	0
Djibouti	9	0
Burundi	7	0
Mali	7	0
Ethiopia	6	0
Cameroon	4	0
Malawi	4	0
Côte d'Ivoire	3	0
Swaziland	2	0
Gabon	1	0
Summary: Number of African countries with confirmed cases: 35 (13 November 2009)

2009 flu pandemic in Africa: Deaths Confirmed cases Suspected cases No reported cases	No deaths 1+ deaths 5+ deaths 10+ deaths 50+ deaths 100+ deaths
50 000+ confirmed cases 5 000+ confirmed cases 500+ confirmed cases 50+ confirmed cases 5+ confirmed cases 1+ confirmed cases	Community Outbreaks

== Algeria ==
The first case of swine influenza was detected in Algeria on June 20. This was an Algerian national, resident in Frankfurt and coming from Miami with her two children.

This first case was detected at Houari Boumediene Airport. Many Algerian immigrants and tourists were arriving during this holiday period, increasing the risk of spreading the virus. The woman suffering from flu was immediately transferred to the hospital of El-Kettar’ in Algiers.

== Benin ==
As of May 2, 2009 there was one suspected case of swine flu in Benin.

== Egypt ==
The Egyptian government increased numbers of medical officers at Cairo Airport and pledged to monitor passengers from Mexico during their stay.

The government ordered the mass slaughter of all pigs in Egypt on April 29, even though the pandemic strain was a human-human transmittable, human influenza that has already previously hybridized with avian and swine flu. The World Organisation for Animal Health called the swine killing "scientifically unjustified".

Egypt commenced the slaughter on 2 May 2009. On the next day in Cairo, an estimated 300 Coptic Christian residents of the Manshiyat Nasr district set up blockades on the street in attempt to keep government officers from confiscating their pigs, which led to clashes with the police. Al-Ahram, a widely circulated Egyptian newspaper, reported that owners of destroyed pigs would receive E£1,000 (approximately US$177.70) per animal in compensation, but Reuters reported that the issue was still "under discussion", citing an Egyptian cabinet spokesman.

The first case of the novel H1N1 virus was discovered in Cairo, Egypt on the second of June, in a 12-year-old girl coming from the US with her mother. Only the girl was infected, and the officials caught the case before she left the airport.

A second and third case were discovered on Sunday 7 June: two students at the American University of Cairo.

As of June 9, there was 8 confirmed case of swine flu in Egypt.

On June 11, 2 more cases were discovered, along with 2 cases discovered a day earlier, bringing the total number of swine flu cases to 12.

As of December 3, the confirmed cases were 3558 and the deaths of 24. As of January 31, there were 258 confirmed deaths from A/H1N1 influenza in Egypt, and in excess of 15,800 confirmed cases of H1N1.

== Ethiopia ==
On June 19, 2009 the Ethiopian government reported two cases of swine flu. They were both in girls who had returned from school in the United States for summer break. One additional case was reported by July 6. By December 14, 2009, six cases had been reported with no deaths contributed to the flu.

== Ghana ==
Ghana banned the importation of pork and pork products. As of December 14, 2009, Ghana had 54 cases with no deaths reported.

== Kenya ==
Kenya health authorities started screening travellers at Jomo Kenyatta and Moi international airports on April 28. Public Health and Sanitation minister Beth Mugo said travellers from Mexico and those from Texas, California and New York were being screened.

On June 29, a British medical student became the first confirmed case of swine flu in Kenya. The student, who was in a group of 33, was in Kenya to attend a series of medical camps in Nyanza province. The whole group was quarantined in their hotel in Kisumu while undergoing treatment.

There was a panic in Nairobi as mobile text messages circulated warning people to stay away from Sarit centre, a popular commercial establishment where another suspected case had been diagnosed. The patient's test results, however, came back negative for the H1N1 virus.

As of December 14, 2009, Kenya had 417 cases with no deaths reported.

== Libya ==
On 6 July 2009, Libya had its first confirmed case of swine flu from a man that had travelled from Thailand via Dubai. As of December 5, 2009, Libya had 124 cases with no deaths.

== Morocco ==
Morocco confirmed the first case of novel human swine flu (A/H1N1-2009) on 12 June, in an 18-year-old university student returning from Canada. As of December 5, 2009, Morocco had 1,763 cases with 5 deaths.

== Namibia ==
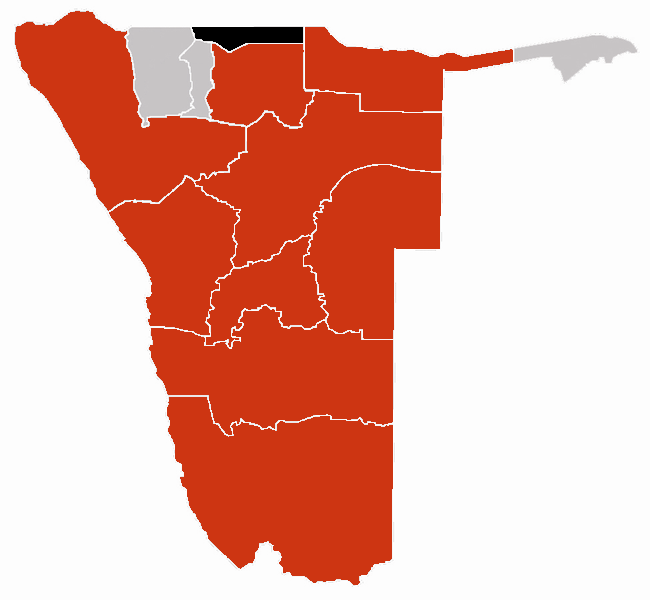
Outbreak evolution in Namibia Deaths Confirmed cases

Namibia confirmed its first two cases of swine flu on July 20.

Both cases involved young adults who had been traveling in other countries: a 13-year-old boy from Rehoboth who returned from a rugby trip with 20 other students in South Africa and a young student returning from Europe. The latter was taken by ambulance to hospital directly from the international airport in Windhoek as she showed severe signs of flu.

== Nigeria ==
Nigerian Health Minister Babatunde Osotimehin announced that the country was stockpiling antiviral treatments, informing the public and increasing surveillance.

The first A/H1N1 death was confirmed in Nigeria on 5 January 2010, with the victim being a 38-year-old woman from Lagos who was infected in the US.

== Tunisia ==
Tunisia confirmed the two first cases of swine flu (A/H1N1-2009) on June 22. Both cases were returning from the United States, and recovered quickly.

== South Africa ==
Outbreak evolution in South Africa Deaths Confirmed cases

On April 29, South Africa reported two possible cases of swine flu from two women who had recently travelled in Mexico. On June 18, the first case was confirmed. Later, on 29 June the South African National Department of Health confirmed 7 cases of swine influenza in the country.

The first death in South Africa was confirmed on 3 August. The victim was a student at the University of Stellenbosch. A few days later the second confirmed death was announced: a male in Durban, Mount Edgecombe As of December 14, 2009, South Africa had 12631 cases with 91 deaths.

The H1N1 virus was a concern for the 2010 FIFA World Cup, which took place in June 2010 but there were not any major issues with the flu during the tournament.

== Sudan ==
The first case of swine flu in Sudan was confirmed in mid-July 2009. At the end of November the first case was confirmed in Southern Sudan.

As of December 28, 2009, there were five deaths and over 150 confirmed cases of swine flu in Sudan.

== Zambia ==
An emergency task force was set up by the Zambian government.

== Timeline ==
2009	A(H1N1) Outbreak and Pandemic Milestones in Africa
2 June	First case confirmed in Egypt.
12 June	First case confirmed in Morocco.
18 June	First case confirmed in South Africa.
19 June	First case confirmed in Ethiopia.
20 June	First case confirmed in Algeria.
22 June	First case confirmed in Tunisia.
24 June	First case confirmed in the Cape Verde Islands.
24 June	(Ivory Coast) First case confirmed in Côte d'Ivoire.
29 June	First case confirmed in Kenya.
29 June	First case confirmed in Mauritius.
30 June	Community outbreaks confirmed in Egypt.
2 July	First case confirmed in Uganda.
6 July	First case confirmed in Libya.
8 July	First case confirmed in Seychelles.
9 July	First case confirmed in Tanzania.
10 July	First case confirmed in Botswana.
10 July	(Réunion) First case confirmed in Reunion.
10 July	First case confirmed in Zimbabwe.
16 July	First case confirmed in Sudan.
16 July	Community outbreaks confirmed in Morocco.
19 July	First death confirmed in Egypt, thus Africa.
20 July	First case confirmed in Namibia.
25 July	Community outbreaks confirmed in South Africa.
28 July	First case confirmed in Zambia.
29 July	(Eswatini) First case confirmed in Swaziland.
30 July	First case confirmed in Gabon.
1 August	First case confirmed in Mayotte.
3 August	First death confirmed in South Africa.
6 August	First case confirmed in Ghana.
9 August	Community outbreaks confirmed in Algeria.
10 August	First death confirmed in Mauritius.
14 August	First case confirmed in Cameroon.
14 August	First case confirmed in Madagascar.
15 August	First case confirmed in Democratic Republic of the Congo.
17 August	First case confirmed in Mozambique.
26 August	First case confirmed in Angola.
31 August	First case confirmed in Djibouti.
1 September	First case confirmed in Lesotho.
1 September	(Réunion) First death confirmed in Reunion.
7 September	First death confirmed in Namibia.
8 September	First death confirmed in Madagascar.
10 September	First case confirmed in Malawi.
14 September	First death confirmed in Mozambique.
6 October	First death confirmed in Tanzania.
12 October	First case confirmed in Rwanda.
12 October	First case confirmed in São Tomé and Príncipe.
15 October	First death confirmed in Mayotte.
18 October	First death confirmed in Sudan.
25 October	First death confirmed in São Tomé and Príncipe.
29 October	First case confirmed in the Republic of the Congo.
29 October	First case confirmed in Nigeria.
1 November	Mass vaccinations in Morocco begins
3 November	Mass vaccinations in Egypt begins
11 November	First case confirmed in Burundi.
13 November	First case confirmed in Somalia.
16 November	First death confirmed in Tunisia.
16 November	First death confirmed in Morocco.
27 November	First death confirmed in Algeria.
30 November	First death confirmed in Libya.
2010	A(H1N1) Outbreak and Pandemic Milestones in Africa
5 January	First death confirmed in Nigeria.
11 January	First case confirmed in Mali.
29 January	First case confirmed in Chad.
3 February	First case confirmed in Mauritania.
9 February	First case confirmed in Senegal.
25 February	First case confirmed in Niger.
12 April	First case confirmed in Guinea.
