= Agencia Boliviana de Información =

Agencia Boliviana de Información (ABI) is a government press agency based in Bolivia.

Based in La Paz, it provides information in Spanish.
