= 2009 swine flu pandemic in Costa Rica =

Costa Rica Confirmed cases followed by death Confirmed cases Unconfirmed or suspected cases

In March and April 2009, an outbreak of a new strain of flu (also known as influenza), popularly known as swine flu, was discovered to have infected several people in Mexico and the states of California and Texas in the United States. On April 28 Costa Rica became the first Central American country to report the outbreak of the virus, with a confirmed infection. As of November 4 the Costa Rican Ministry of Health had 1,596 confirmed cases, 1,275 pending cases, 8,000 already discarded, and 38 deaths.

On July 31, local authorities announced that the country was selected among the sample countries that will be part of the test of the vaccine developed by Swiss pharmaceutical Novartis. The local sample will include 784 Costa Ricans ages 3 to 64. Besides Costa Rica, this vaccine prototype will be tested also in Mexico and the United States.

On August 11, it was confirmed that Costa Rica's president, Óscar Arias Sánchez, was infected with the A(H1N1) virus, becoming the first head of state sick with the A(H1N1) virus President Arias returned to his normal activities after one week of isolation at his home.

== Initial outbreak ==
The first confirmed influenza A (H1N1) case in Costa Rica was announced on April 28. It was that of a young woman hospitalized in San Jose. On April 28, Minister of Health of Costa Rica, Maria Luisa Avila confirmed the second case, a 29-year-old man hospitalized at the Hospital San Vicente de Paul in Heredia.

The Ministry of Health reported the existence of two new probable cases of swine flu in the country on the morning of May 2. These were a 53-year-old man who had not traveled to Mexico, in a hospital in San Jose, and a 24-year-old woman who is recovering at home. These new patients brought the total number of Costa Ricans affected by the virus to four. Three are listed as probable cases, while one was duly confirmed by the Centers for Disease Control and Prevention in the United States. Four more cases were confirmed on May 4 by the Costa Rican " Centro Nacional de Referencia en Virología." All of these patients have recently traveled to Mexico. Since April 29, the Ministry of Health recommended avoiding travel to Mexico, Canada, and the U.S. as the number of confirmed cases by local authorities reached eight.

On May 12, the Minister of Health announced that an alert was received from U.S. authorities informing that three members from a Boston chorus, Canta Mundi, that traveled to several tourism places in Costa Rica during April, showed symptoms of AH1N1 flu after returning to the U.S. On May 13 Costa Rican health authorities announced four new probable cases, three of which had contact with the Boston chorus, and a follow-up is being done with those who had contact with the chorus. A couple of English language newspapers questioned whether the chorus members had infected locals, or rather the Boston youngsters picked up the disease in Costa Rica, as the chorus flew directly from the United States to Costa Rica.

Beginning May 20, probable cases are now confirmed locally by the laboratorio de Virología del Instituto Costarricense de Investigación y Enseñanza en Nutrición y Salud (Inciensa), which now can confirm the presence of the A (H1N1) virus in 24 hours. Previously, all samples had to be sent to the U.S. Centers for Disease Control and Prevention for confirmation. Among the 26 confirmed cases until May 21, six patients had contact with the Boston Chorus and the Ministry of Health reported that all patients have a stable condition.

== July and August contagion surge ==
As a result of a wave of new cases that occurred by early July, the Ministry of Health announced a new strategy to deal with this peak that resulted in increased deaths. Beginning July 11, 2009, testing for the virus will be conducted only on patients with risk factors and critical cases, including those with fever above 39 °C and patients with respiratory difficulties, as the primary objective now is to reduce mortality rather than avoid contagion. This policy means that statistics regarding the number of cases will no longer reflect the total number of actual cases. Also, mid-year school vacations were extended one week to curb contagion.

On July 21 the Ministry of Health, in agreement with the Catholic Church, and to prevent a massive contagion, prohibited the traditional pilgrimage to the Basílica de Nuestra Señora de los Ángeles (Our Lady of the Angels Basilica), patroness of catholic Costa Ricans. This pilgrimage has occurred every year on August 1 since 227 years ago, and this is the first time it has been suspended. Health authorities estimate the risk of contagion in 20,000 people, as around two million pilgrims would have participated in this traditional religious event.

On July 31, local authorities announced that the country was selected among the sample countries that will be part of the test of the vaccine developed by Swiss pharmaceutical Novartis. The local sample will include 784 Costa Ricans ages 3 to 64. Besides Costa Rica, this vaccine prototype will also be tested in Mexico and the United States.

As of November 4, the Costa Rican Ministry of Health had 1,596 confirmed cases, 1,275 pending cases, 8,000 already discarded, and 38 deaths, with an infection rate of 35,32 per 100,000 people.

== First deaths ==
The Ministry of Health received confirmation on May 8 from the Centers for Disease Control of seven cases of infection with influenza A/H1N1 virus. Health Minister Maria Luisa Avila announced that these were three men, aged 24, 30, and 53, two women, aged 20 and 25; two girls, aged 4 and 11, and a boy, aged 3. "They are people who were in Mexico or had contact with travelers to that country", said the Ministry. The 53-year-old man became the first fatality in Costa Rica, confirmed on May 9 by the Minister of Health.

Out of the seven remaining cases confirmed by the U.S. Centers for Disease Control, three were children infected by the patient who died, and their condition never was critical. Costa Rica became the fourth country in the world, after Mexico, the United States and Canada to confirm fatalities related to the influenza virus A (H1N1).

The deceased man had other chronic diseases. The Minister of Health informed he had diabetes and also had chronic obstructive pulmonary disease (COPD). She also informed the man was infected inside Costa Rica because he had not traveled to Mexico and that a total of 51 persons were identified who had contact with the sick man, but only three turned out positive.

The second fatality was a 35-year-old woman who died on June 23, less than 24 hours after arriving at the emergency room at a local hospital. The woman had hypertension and was morbidly obese. A third patient died on June 29, a 55-year-old man who presented chronic obstructive pulmonary disease due to smoking. A 45-year-old woman was the fourth fatality. She died on July 4.

The fifth death occurred on July 11. The patient was a 25-year-old woman pregnant with twins. Both five-month-old fetuses died hours before their mother did. The sixth fatality occurred on July 13, a 45-year-old man. This was the first patient to die who did not have any of the risk factors previously identified in other deceased patients. The seventh confirmed fatality was a 24-year-old man, who smoked and was obese.

== Later fatalities ==
As of October 15, 2009, health authorities had confirmed 38 fatalities, the last one having taken place in late September, and the death of a Costa Rican woman in Nicaragua was also confirmed. The mortality rate is 0.85 deaths by 100,000 people, and the fatality rate is 2.48%. From all deceased patients, 47.3% occurred among San José residents, and only the Guanacaste Province has not had any deaths related to the virus. The deceased's age varies between 20 and 79 years, with an average age of 41.

total deaths by province and sex (April 23 to September 7, 2009)
Provincia	Total	Femenino	Masculino
San José	18	7	11
Heredia	5	3	2
Alajuela	6	0	6
Limón	4	3	1
Puntarenas	3	1	2
Cartago	2	2	0
Total	38	16	22
Source: Dirección Vigilancia de la Salud.

Until early September, the most frequent risk factors presented by the deceased patients are obesity (36.4%), diabetes (18.2%), asthma (18.2%), pregnancy (9.1%) and chronic obstructive pulmonary disease (6.1%).
