= 2009 swine flu pandemic in Uruguay =

Pandemic of H1N1 influenza

2009 swine flu outbreak in Uruguay
- Confirmed cases Deaths confirmed
- Disease: Swine flu
- Pathogen: H1N1
- Arrival date: 27 May 2009
- Confirmed cases: 550
- Suspected cases: 1500+
- Deaths: 20

The Influenza A (H1N1), also known by the name of swine flu, arrived to Uruguay on May 27, 2009.

== Timeline ==
=== May ===
May 27: The Ministry of Health confirmed the two first cases of Influenza A (H1N1) in the country, one of them is a 24-year-old man and the other is a 15-year-old minor. Both have travelled to Argentina and returned to Montevideo without apparent symptoms. Both have participated in an Equestrian Tournament that was being held on Argentina. The Ministry of Health warned about taking preventive measures against contracting the disease.

May 29: Four new cases were confirmed. The age of the infected persons are between 11 and 28 years old, all located in Montevideo. The Ministry of Health is studying new probable cases, one located in Florida, one in Salto, and two in Rivera. The total number of cases ascends to six.

May 31: Five new cases confirmed. The Ministry of Health have studied 33 suspected cases, only five cases are positive. Four of them are from Montevideo, and the remaining, is the first case from Canelones. The number of cases are now 11.

=== June ===
June 1: Four new cases confirmed. The Ministry of Health declares that all of the infected cases are 'imported' from Argentina. However, Uruguay will not shut down borders with the bordering countries. The first case in Colonia is detected. The number of cases are now 15.

June 4: Two new cases confirmed. These cases are located in Montevideo, the total of cases is of 17.

June 5: Four new cases confirmed, all from Montevideo. The total is now raised to 21.

June 7: Three new cases. All those infected, with one exception, are of Montevideo, the remaining case is from Canelones. Two schools announced that will be closed the next day in order to prevent infections. The total is now of 24.

June 8: Three new cases are reported. Another school closes its doors in order to prevent a raise in infected cases. The total of cases is raised to 27.

June 9: Five new cases, raising the total to 32. One of which is located in Maldonado.

June 10: Four new cases, all of them located in Montevideo. The total is now raised to 36.

June 22: After several days of silence regarding to diagnosing cases, the Ministry of Health has announced that Uruguay has a total of 195 cases. No reports of death have been confirmed yet.

June 29: The first death appears; it was a 60-year-old woman, who had also another organic disorders, that, added to the flu, led to her death.

=== July ===
July 3: Three new deaths registered on the country. A 60-year-old retired fireman was the second decease of the A Influenza outbreak, started on Uruguay last May 27, he had diabetes and cardiovascular diseases that led to his death. In Punta del Este (Maldonado), a 54-year-old woman turned into the third fatal case on the country, as the previous cases, she had several pathological problems, (cardiac between them). And a 56-year-old woman in Montevideo, became the fourth dead due to this disease. She had, as well, many pathological problems, including morbid obesity, and diabetes.

== Decision of the Ministry of Health ==
On June 12, 2009, the Ministry of Public Health announced that it will stop notifying H1N1 cases, stating that since the H1N1 has achieved the pandemic status, the notification of new cases is no longer needed. However, Uruguay wouldn't stop studying new probable cases. On June 17, 2009, the number of probable cases were from more than 1.500, a specific number can't be specified as of 2013.
