= 2009 swine flu pandemic in Hong Kong =

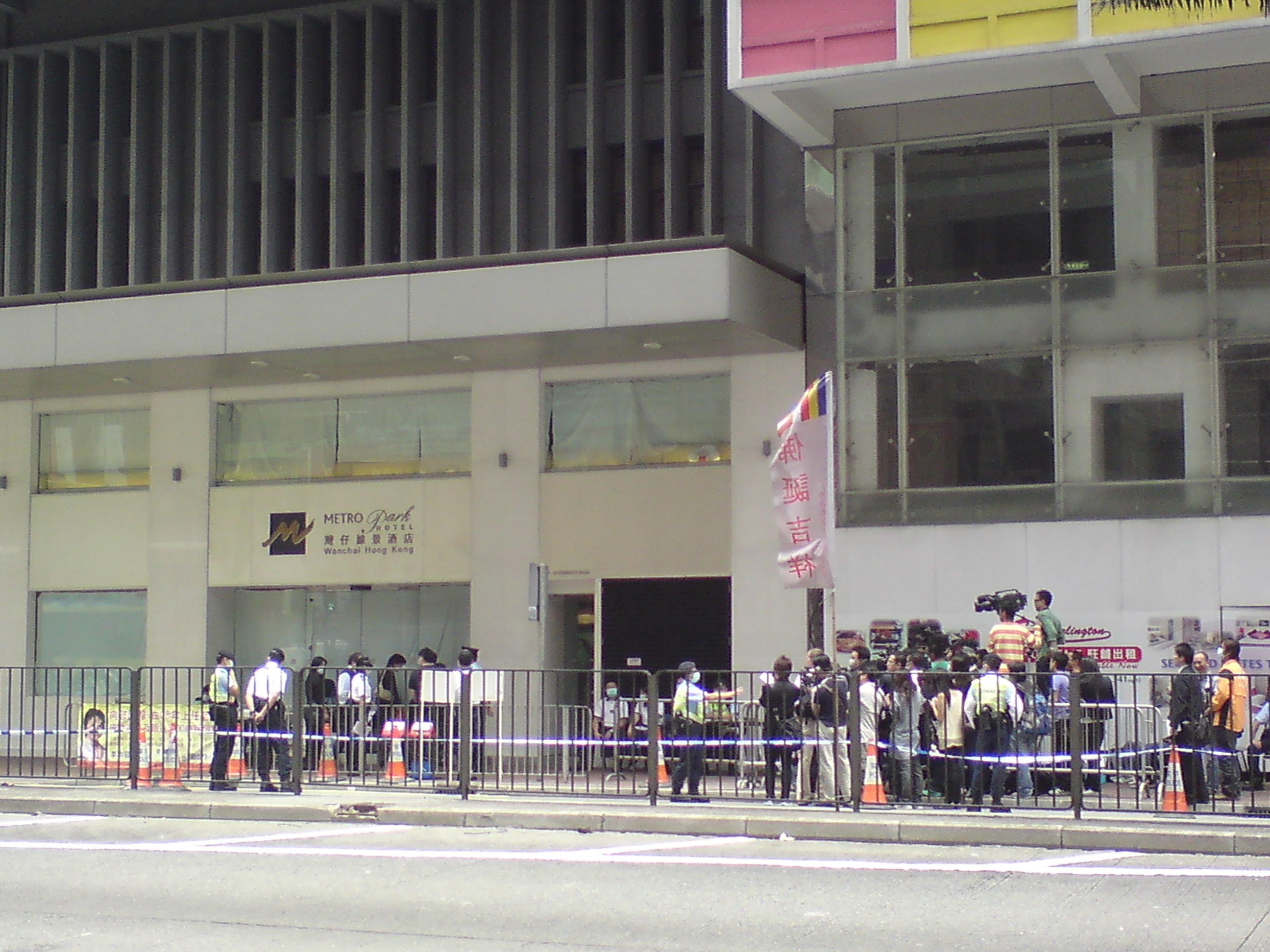
Metropark Hotel in Wan Chai while it was under quarantine because of the first reported case of swine flu in Hong Kong

The 2009 flu pandemic in Hong Kong was part of the worldwide pandemic that started with the city's first reported case of influenza A virus subtype H1N1 infection, commonly called swine flu, on 1 May 2009, by a Mexican national who had travelled to Hong Kong via Shanghai. It was also the first reported case in Asia. There were 32,301 confirmed cases of swine flu in the city.

== Initial response ==
Following the news of the flu outbreak in Mexico and the United States, on 26 April, Secretary for Food and Health York Chow announced that Hong Kong had raised its influenza pandemic alertness level to "serious", out of three possible alertness levels: alert, serious and emergency. Hong Kong also became one of the first jurisdictions to declare swine flu as a notifiable disease, and much of the procedures against its spread were learned from the 2003 SARS outbreak, of which Hong Kong was the center. Chow advised Hong Kong residents to avoid travelling to cities facing this outbreak and stated that swine flu has been added to the list of notifiable disease, which required cases of the flu to be reported to the government. Residents were also advised to take precautionary measures against infection if they're about to travel to affected areas. Surveillance measures at boundary control points were boosted to detect travellers with fever and respiratory symptoms, and travellers who were suspected of being infected would be quarantined and monitored.

== First case ==
On 1 May, Hong Kong Chief Executive Donald Tsang told reporters that tests performed by the Department of Health and the University of Hong Kong confirmed that a 25-year-old Mexican citizen who had traveled to the city via Shanghai on a China Eastern Airlines flight was infected with swine flu. In light of this, Tsang raised Hong Kong's influenza pandemic alertness level to "emergency" from "serious". This first confirmed case of swine flu in Hong Kong was also the first confirmed case in Asia. The man had developed a fever after arriving in Hong Kong, and was then isolated in Princess Margaret Hospital, the hospital designated to handle swine flu cases. The hotel where the traveller had stayed, the Metropark Hotel in Wanchai, was quarantined and about 200 guests and 100 staff were instructed to remain in the hotel for seven days regardless of whether or not they had come into contact with the traveller. Authorities also made an effort to track down anybody who had made contact with the traveller, with Chow appealing to those who were on the same flight as the traveller to contact health officials.

The guests and staff were released on 8 May, when the quarantine expired. Tsang was at the hotel for the release, speaking to reporters and with those who had been quarantined. To compensate for the quarantine, the government offered guests two free nights of accommodation at other hotels in Hong Kong. The Mexican traveller was also discharged after treatment with the antiviral drug Tamiflu and the Centre for Health Protection confirmed that he was no longer carrying the virus.

== School closure ==
Following the finding that 12 students at St. Paul's Convent School contracted the swine flu virus, Chief Executive Donald Tsang ordered the closure of all primary schools, kindergartens, and special schools for two weeks starting from 12 June. The 12 cases of infection were confirmed to be the first known cluster of local transmission of the virus. According to the Education Bureau, the school closure affected about 500,000 students from 964 kindergartens, 601 primary schools and 61 special schools.

== See also ==
- 7 Days in Life
- 2009 flu pandemic
- 2009 flu pandemic in Asia
- 2009 flu pandemic by country
- 2009 flu pandemic timeline
- 2009 flu pandemic tables
- Severe acute respiratory syndrome (SARS)
