= 2009 swine flu pandemic in Australia =

2009 Human Swine Influenza pandemic in Australia caused by the H1N1 influenza virus

- Deaths Confirmed cases

- 5000+ confirmed cases 500+ Confirmed cases 50+ Confirmed cases 5+ Confirmed cases 1+ Confirmed cases

- 1+ deaths 5+ deaths 20+ deaths Influenza A H1N1 2009 swine flu pandemic evolution in Australia
- Disease: H1N1 Influenza (Human Swine Influenza)
- Pathogen: H1N1
- First outbreak: Thought to be Central Mexico
- Arrival date: 27 April 2009
- Confirmed cases: 37,537
- Suspected cases: n/a
- Deaths: 191

Cases by region Last update: December 2009
Sub-division	Cases		Deaths
Sub-division	Laboratory confirmed	Suspected^{‡}	Deaths
Totals	37,537	n/a	191
Australian Capital Territory	939	n/a	n/a
New South Wales	5,078	n/a	n/a
Northern Territory	1,456	n/a	n/a
Queensland	11,528	n/a	n/a
South Australia	8,944	n/a	n/a
Tasmania	3,204	n/a	n/a
Victoria	3,058	n/a	n/a
Western Australia	4,499	n/a	n/a

Australia had 37,537 confirmed cases of H1N1 Influenza 2009 (Human Swine Influenza) and 191 deaths reported by Department of Health but only 77 deaths reported by the Australian Bureau of Statistics. The actual numbers are much larger, as only serious cases warranted being tested and treated at the time. Suspected cases have not been reported by the Department of Health and Ageing since 18 May 2009 because they were changing too quickly to report. Sources say that as many as 1600 Australians may have actually died as a result of this virus. On 23 May 2009 the federal government classified the outbreak as CONTAIN phase except in Victoria where it was escalated to the SUSTAIN phase on 3 June 2009. This gave government authorities permission to close schools in order to slow the spread of the disease. On 17 June 2009 the Department of Health and Ageing introduced a new phase called PROTECT. This modified the response to focus on people with high risk of complications from the disease. Testing at airports was discontinued. The national stockpile of antiviral drugs were no longer made available to people with the flu unless there were more than mild symptoms or a high risk of dying.

== Context ==
There are on average 2,500–3,000 deaths every year as a result of seasonal influenza in Australia. An estimated 1 billion are infected seasonally throughout the world. By 18 December 2009 in Australia, 37,537 swine flu tests yielded positive results and the confirmed death toll of people infected with swine flu was 191.

== Epidemiology ==
The first case of swine flu in Australia was reported on 9 May 2009 in a 33-year-old woman from Queensland when she touched down from a flight from Los Angeles to Brisbane. Although it was confirmed to be not infectious (coming out as a "weak but positive result"), family members and people who were sitting close to her during the flight were contacted and urged to seek immediate medical attention if they began to show flu-like symptoms. On 24 May Queensland confirmed its second case. 41 deaths were recorded in Queensland. The first person to die in Queensland was a 38-year-old woman on 15 July at the Mater Hospital Pimlico.

== Reported cases by state and territory ==
=== Victoria ===
In Victoria 2,440 cases were reported, including 24 deaths. An 11-year-old boy, and later his 2 brothers, were confirmed on 20 May to carry the virus. Victorian health authorities closed Clifton Hill Primary School for two days on 21 May, initially, after the three brothers returned to the school from a trip to Disneyland. Another case delayed the reopening of the school until Thursday 28 May 2009. On 23 May about 22 year-nine students of Mill Park Secondary College were given anti-viral Tamiflu after one of their classmates was diagnosed with swine flu. The same situation happened for students in year nine at the University High School in Parkville and also for the Melton campus of Mowbray College after a year 10 student contracted the virus . A 35-year-old man from Colac died on 20 June 2009 at Maroondah Hospital after going to Colac Hospital the previous day. On 23 June 2009, the second swine flu related death in Victoria was reported, that of a 50-year-old woman at the Peter MacCallum Cancer Centre. A third death was reported on 25 June. Two more deaths were reported on the weekend of 27 and 28 June. Two more deaths were reported on 1 July, which included a 3-year-old. Four more deaths were recorded on 8 July.

=== New South Wales ===
In New South Wales 51 deaths were recorded. The first confirmed death in New South Wales occurred on 29 June and a second man died on 3 July.

=== South Australia ===
South Australia recorded 28 deaths, plus a 'clinical positive' where the test was inconclusive and, after swine-flu-like symptoms were reported, Tamiflu was administered, thus making a future positive confirmation unlikely. Adelaide high schools Eynesbury Senior College and Blackfriars Priory School closed for a week. The first confirmed death from swine flu in South Australia was a 26-year-old Aboriginal man from Kiwirrkurra Community in the Western Desert of Western Australia who died in Royal Adelaide Hospital on 19 June.

=== Australian Capital Territory ===
The Australian Capital Territory recorded 2 deaths and confirmed 920 cases by 28 August 2009. Two of the earliest casualties contracted the disease while on the Pacific Dawn cruise ship. The first death in the ACT occurred on 28 July 2009.

=== Western Australia ===
There were 27 confirmed deaths in Western Australia. On 26 June 2009, a 26-year-old woman was the first person to die in the state. A 26-year-old Western Australian man died in Adelaide on 19 June.

=== Tasmania ===
Tasmania recorded seven deaths. The first person to die in Tasmania was an 85-year-old woman who died in Royal Hobart Hospital on 5 July.

=== Northern Territory ===
The Northern Territory confirmed the first infection of a person on 30 May 2009. By this time, six people in the territory had died. The first person in the Territory to die from the epidemic was a man in his early 50s who died at the Royal Darwin Hospital on 6 July.

== Overseas cases ==
The swine flu also affected some Australians internationally:

- 3 Australians in London had confirmed cases of swine flu.

Australians in quarantine:

- 7 in South Korea
- 7 in China including 1 confirmed case
- 1 confirmed case in Taiwan recovered and released
- 2, a mother and child, in the Philippines
- 1 confirmed case of a 12-year-old boy in Singapore who began showing symptoms while on a flight from Sydney

== Containment and control ==
=== Preparations ===
In 2008, the Australian government prepared for a possible flu pandemic by creating the Australian Health Management Plan for Pandemic Influenza (AHMPPI). When the outbreak hit its peak in 2009, this plan went into action. The plan followed six steps:

1. ALERT: Before the pandemic even began, the country was following ALERT protocol. This entailed watching out for a possible pandemic.
2. DELAY: Activated 28 April 2009 with the goal to prevent the virus from coming into Australia for as long as possible.
3. CONTAIN: Activated on 22 May 2009 after several cases of H1N1 flu were reported in various states of Australia. This phase of the plan aimed to contain the spread of the flu by encouraging those who were sick to stay home, quarantine, and isolate themselves. This also gave authorities in all states the option to close schools if students were at risk. All states and territories ordered students returning from countries where flu was widespread (Canada, Japan, Mexico, Panama and United States) not to return to school for a week after entering Australia. States outside Victoria decided to prevent students returning to school for a week if they had visited Victoria.
4. SUSTAIN: On 3 June 2009, the state of Victoria escalated from CONTAIN to SUSTAIN. The SUSTAIN phase in Victoria meant that less effort was given to tracing and testing, as there would have been insufficient resources available to do this. Antiviral drugs in this phase were only available to confirmed cases or their immediate contacts.
5. CONTROL
6. RECOVER
- PROTECT: A new phase of the plan that was activated in June 2009 to identify and protect the populations that were the most at risk of fatality from the flu.

The Australian Government had a stockpile of 40 million surgical grade face masks. However, stocks of face masks in pharmacies were depleted due to personal purchases. The World Health Organization Influenza Centre in North Melbourne was attempting to develop a vaccine for swine flu by growing the live virus as found in California, in chicken embryos. The first one-litre batch of vaccine was announced to be ready on 29 June 2009 by the University of Queensland, but would not be available for use until it was registered as safe with the regulatory authority.

A Commonwealth Health hotline for Swine Influenza was set up on Australian phone number 1802007 by the Department of Health and Ageing. The Australian Government set up a health emergency web site. Daily tallies of suspected cases were given.

The Tasmanian Government set up a Tasmanian Action Plan for Human Influenza Pandemic.

The Queensland Government had an action plan prepared in 2008 and a business continuity plan in 2006. The Australian Capital Territory Chief Medical Officer, Dr Charles Guest, claimed that procedures and systems were very good to detect and respond to the disease outbreak. South Australia nominated eight hospitals to handle the flu: Royal Adelaide, Flinders Medical Centre or Women's and Children's Hospital, Berri, Mount Gambier, Port Lincoln, Whyalla or Port Augusta. The Victorian Government Department of Human Services had a nurse on call to answer questions on the topic.

CSL Limited started to produce a vaccine to immunize against swine flu. The Australian Government ordered ten million doses of the new vaccine.

In Melbourne, seven special clinics for influenza opened on 29 May.

=== Government travel advice ===
Per recommendations by the World Health Organization, Australia decided against closing their borders during the DELAY phase of the outbreak. There were also no restrictions of travel to and from countries where outbreaks were occurring. However, starting on 30 April, thermal imaging was applied to passenger arrivals at international airports and arriving passengers were required to fill in a card. Customs officers checked aeroplane cabins prior to disembarkation of passengers to look for people with flu symptoms.

=== Health recommendations ===
The Australian Government created a nationwide campaign project that encouraged Australians to take up healthy practices such as adequate hand washing, avoiding people who were more susceptible to death from the flu, and getting the vaccine that was available. This was done in media, print, and radio forms so that it could reach the most people as possible. Another main focus of the Australian campaign was to dispel myths about the flu in order to provide citizens with the most factual information available at the time.

At the peak of the outbreak, Australia had a stockpile of 8.7 million doses of Tamiflu and Relenza to combat the virus.

== Evaluation ==
In a 2011 article in the Emerging Health Threats Journal, Peter Collignon commented that the media frequently compared the outbreaks to the 1918 flu pandemic that infected 500 million people and killed tens of millions. Widespread public fear of a similar number of deaths led to "Emergency Departments and doctor surgeries being overwhelmed" with requests for antiviral drugs, jeopardising the supply for the highest risk patients.

== Statistics ==
- During the 2009 flu season in Australia, there were 37,537 confirmed cases of pandemic (H1N1) 2009 and 191 deaths reported in Australia according to Department of Health.
- In 2009, H1N1 Influenza 2009 (Human Swine Influenza) was the underlying cause of 77 deaths in Australia. The ABS implemented World Health Organization (WHO) guidelines to code all swine flu deaths to the ICD-10 code of Influenza due to certain identified influenza virus (J09).
