= Jesús Mantilla =

Venezuelan politician

Jesús Mantilla Oliveros was the Minister of Public Health and Social Development of Venezuela up to 2009.
