= 2009 flu pandemic in Eurasia =

2009 flu pandemic in Eurasia may refer to:

- 2009-2010 flu pandemic in Asia
- 2009-2010 flu pandemic in Europe
