= Tecuceanu =

Tecuceanu is a Romanian surname. It is a toponymic surname, derived from Tecuci. Notable people with the surname include:

- Catalin Tecuceanu (born 1999), Romanian-born Italian athlete
- Toni Tecuceanu (1972–2010), Romanian comedy actor
- Horia Tecuceanu (1929–1997), Romanian writer
