= 2009 swine flu pandemic in France =

The 2009 flu pandemic, involving an outbreak of a new strain of influenza commonly known as swine flu (usually referred as grippe A or grippe porcine in French), reached France in early May 2009.

In order to respond to flu epidemics in France, the government has a "national plan", which is also applied for this flu pandemic. In this plan, the different phases of the flu, which are slightly different from the World Health Organization phases, are detailed.

== Organisations involved in France ==
- The High Council of Public Health (Haut Conseil de la Sante Publique - www.hcsp.fr) issues recommendations that are taken into account by the government in its decisions.
- The Institut national de veille sanitaire (National Institute for Sanitary Watch) is the body in charge of following the health situation in France. It issues a daily digest of the situation. It also issues the official French definition of cases: possible cases, probable cases, confirmed cases, excluded cases.
- The Groupes Régionaux d'Observation de la Grippe - GROG (Regional Flu Observational Groups) is a network of doctors in France created in 1984 who shares information about the number of cases and evolution of symptoms for the seasonal flues. They issues a weekly bulletin, available on internet.
- The Réseau Sentinelles (Sentinelles Network) is another network of doctors in France created in 1984, they issues weekly updates (available in English) and have some historical information about the flu incidence in France.

== Government reaction to the flu ==
A governmental web site has been created to inform the population of the dangers and good practices to avoid the spread of the disease.

The French government lags behind the decision of the World Health Organization to upgrade to phase 6. It is currently in phase 5A in France.

A mandatory mass vaccination plan has been discussed. This vaccination plan is currently implemented, it is free and not mandatory.

In July 2010, France initially ordered 1,46 doses per inhabitant, the third largest amount among members of the Global Health Security Initiative (GHSI), behind the United Kingdom and Canada. In January, 50 million of the initial 94 million doses were cancelled.

== Timeline ==
=== April ===
The French government asks Europe to decide to cancel all flights to Mexico.

=== May ===
On 1 May, the French Health Minister confirmed, during the 8 p.m. TF1 news, that 2 cases of A(H1N1) flu have been detected in France.

The government discusses the possibility of ordering 100 million vaccine doses against the flu from three companies (GlaxoSmithKline, Sanofi and Novartis).

The French government plans to vaccinate the entire French population (65 million inhabitants)

=== June ===
- 12 June: After a meeting about the crisis, Roselyne Bachelot, Minister of Health, states that there is "no active circulation of the virus in the population and no case of serious illness has occurred so far".
- 15 June: 10 cases discovered among the students of a college at Quint-Fonsegrives in the suburbs of Toulouse. These students had not gone abroad before. This is the first case of contamination of a group of people who did not come back from an affected area in a foreign country. New cases continue to be discovered: on the 18th, the number is 16.
- 18 June: First case of serious illness.
- 26 June: The number of cases reaches 239, of which 10% are not linked to any imported case from another country.

=== July ===
- 3 July: Minister of Health Roselyne Bachelot has underlined that the situation of the flu in France is very different from the one in the United-Kingdom, with far less cases (around 300) in France than in the United-Kingdom (around 10000). She precised that the number of hospitals in France that can handle the patients should rise from 112 to 450 within a week.

=== August ===
- 1 August: First death recorded at the main regional hospital of Brest. Number of cases crosses one thousand. France has finally ordered 94 million vaccines doses (2 by person are necessary), there is also a stock of more than 30 million anti-virus care doses (Tamiflu) and around 1.7 billion masks.
- 12 August: Mohammed Moussaoui, who is the director of the Conseil français du culte musulman (French council of Islam) has advised to French Muslims not to go to Mecca for Ramadan (Umrah). France Television, the national network French television, which is part of the «vital companies» (the ones that the government has decided that they should be able to operate even if the H1N1 pandemic become severe: electricity distribution companies, telecom companies, etc.), has prepared a plan on how to handle the broadcast of TV with 1/10 of its staff.
- 18 August: The government announce a plan for the re-opening of the schools (after the summer holidays), scheduled on September 2: If 3 children are detected with the virus in the same school, the prefet will have the possibility to close the school for a minimum of 6 days, in order to disinfect the whole building.
- 25 August: In New Caledonia (French overseas territory), around 15% of the population has been infected with the virus, killing 5 people in two weeks.
- 28 August: Government announces that a mass vaccination plan could begin on September 28, should the pandemic break out. Vaccination should be free and non-mandatory.
- 28 August: The Castres Olympique rugby union club notifies the Ligue Nationale de Rugby (LNR), the organizer of the country's two professional leagues, that six of their players have been diagnosed with the H1N1 virus. LNR responds by postponing their match against Montauban scheduled for 29 August and their match against Albi set for 2 September.

=== September ===
- 1 September: The A (H1N1) virus is the main flu virus in France.
- 16 September: The French Ministry of Health announces that the epidemic is starting with a limited impact, therefore it is not necessary to increase the alert level.

=== October ===
- 12 October: A study by Société française de médecine d'urgence forecasts that 20% of the French population could be infected.

=== November ===
- 24 November: The H1N1 virus is the main circulating flu virus in France. The circulation of the virus accelerates: 22 persons had died in one week, from a total of 68 since the beginning of the pandemic. A first case of a mutation of the virus which is resistant to oseltamivir (Tamiflu) has been reported.
- 26 November: Epidemic has suddenly accelerated. Mass vaccination plan is under way, "More than 750 000 persons have received the vaccine", says Roselyne Bachelot. The official decision is now to give only one dose of vaccine per person (rather than two previously).
- 27 November: A mutation in the genes of the H1N1 virus has been detected in two persons in France, who have since died. This mutation has also been identified in other European countries. This virus could increase the chances of the virus to reach pulmonary tissues.

=== December ===
- 11 December: Since August, 4.6 million people have had the flu in France. Peak of the epidemic in France is forecasted around the 15th of December. The mass vaccination plan leads to some organizational concerns.
- 29 December: The peak of the epidemic has been reached in France, and the number of cases diminishes strongly.

=== January ===
- 5 January: French government seeks to cancel half the vaccines it had previously ordered from drug manufacturers (Baxter International, GlaxoSmithKline, Novartis, Sanofi-Aventis). The prices of the stocks of these companies are down on financial markets.
- 19 January: The National Institute for Sanitary Watch announces that the epidemic phase of the flu is over.

=== February ===
- 10 February: The High Council of Public Health announces that the vaccination plan should be centered mainly on the population which faces complications and people in contact with the illness (workers in hospital, etc.). Between 12 and 18 million French people, 5.74 million following a vaccine, the rest coming from infection.

=== March ===
- H1N1 flu is basically over in France (it represents less than 1% of ill people). In total, the epidemic has caused around 310 deaths in France.
- Le Parisien reports that 5.7 millions French people were vaccinated in France. 4400 cases of side effects have been reported. There were some serious side-effects for a few persons : 21 deaths, 4 anaphylactic shocks, 9 Idiopathic thrombocytopenic purpura cases, 6 multiple sclerosis cases, and 9 Guillain–Barré syndromes
- The total cost of vaccination plan is 670 million euros, of which 382 comes from the vaccines, the rest coming from the operational setup which was put in places (wages, equipment, mail, etc.).

== France, by region ==
The detailed situation by region is updated by the National Institute of Health

== See also ==
- 2009 flu pandemic vaccine
- 2009 flu pandemic in Spain
- Avian influenza
- Spanish flu
