= Suicide in France =

Social issue

According to WHO's 2016 suicide report, France ranked 48th of the 183 countries listed. France ranked second highest for suicides in Western Europe. France had an overall suicide rate of 12.1 per 100,000 people in 2016. The 2016 suicide rate for French men was 17.9 per 100,000 and 6.5 per 100,000 for women according to WHO's 2016 suicide report. The total suicide rate and the suicide rate for men have declined since 2012 while the suicide rate for women has risen slightly. The rate of suicide in France in 2012 was 12.3 per 100,000 people overall, 19.3 per 100,000 for men and 6 per 100,000 for women.

Suicides at France Telecom captured media attention in 2009, and with some attributing blame on the company's restructuring in the wake of its privatization.

== History ==
Over the period 1910-1943, suicides were elevated during the postwar years and the Great Depression. They decreased during the two World Wars. The most common suicide methods during the period were hanging, drowning and shooting.

The suicide rate in France began increasing between 1975 and 1985, reaching an all time high of 22.5 per 100,000 people in 1985. It began decreasing since. The suicide rate among men in France in 1985 was 33.1 per 100,000.

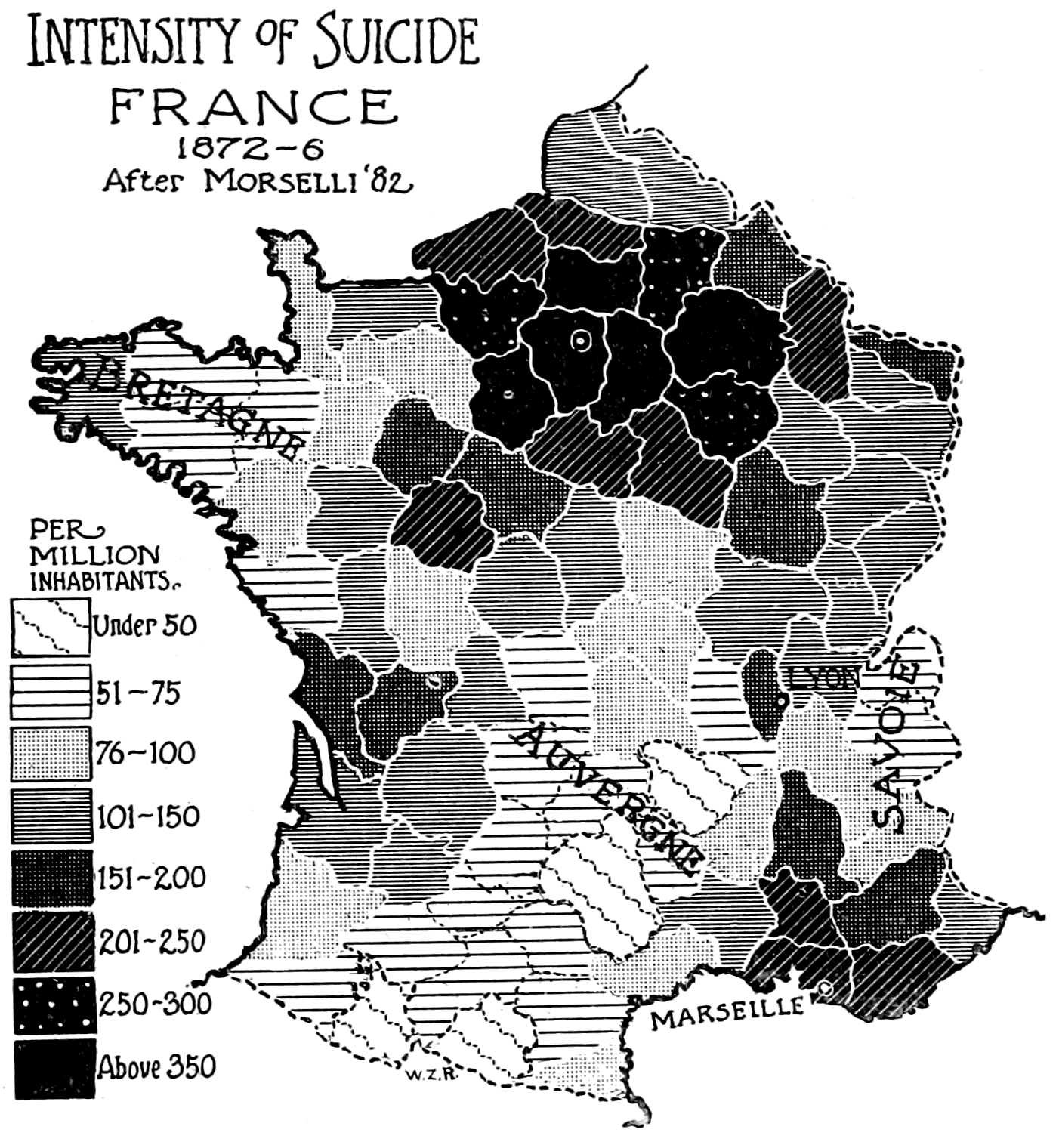
A map showing the prevalence of suicide in France, 1872–1876.

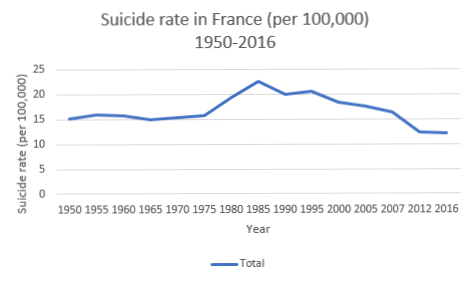
Suicide Rate in France 1950-2016

== Epidemiology ==
The INSERM Réseau Sentinelles monitors the change in the incidence of suicides and the INPES "health barometer" provides information on the change in suicide attempts and suicidal thoughts within the population.

In 2017, France had an average suicide rate of 12.3 suicides per 100,000 inhabitants, down from 17.0 per 100,000 inhabitants in 2006.

In 1996, France had 12,000 suicides for 160,000 attempts, or approximately 19 suicides per 100,000 inhabitants or one suicide per 5,000 people, and one attempt per 400 people.

According to standardized age data available on Eurostat, the statistics agency of the European Union, nearly 8,500 suicides were recorded in France in 2016, compared to 11,994 in 1994, a 40% drop. Suicide is, however, a bigger cause of death than road accidents.

In 2022, according to the French National Suicide Observatory, the suicide rate among men in France remained three times higher than among women (20.8 deaths per 100,000 men in 2022 compared to 6.3 for women). Although women attempt suicide more often, their attempts are less likely to be lethal. This imbalance can be explained, at least in part, by an under-recognition of mental disorders among men, who consult less and express their discomfort with difficulty, due to stereotypes of masculinity and a weak culture of emotional speech. Men often manifest their suffering through risky behaviour, addictions or aggression, which complicates diagnosis and treatment.

=== Statistical analysis ===
The Centre d'épidémiologie sur les causes médicales de décès (Centre for Epidemiology on Medical Causes of Death, or CépiDc) launched a retrospective survey in France (2001-2002) by interviewing 532 physicians on the results of a 1999 study on suicide. The 2002 study concluded that suicides represented in 1999 for these cases approximately 24% of deaths classified as "undetermined" among those under 25 and more than 40% among those over 25. This would lead to an increase in the overall suicide rate of at least 7% 6, and two local surveys showed that taking into account deaths from "unknown or undeclared causes", this proportion would rise to 20%, or even 30%. INSERM considers a probable underestimation of around 10%.

In 2012 There were officially 25 suicides/day on average with significant regional differences. These figures are in reality biased by under-reporting which seems to vary greatly depending on the region. The degree of underestimation in published suicide figures was assessed in 2006 as varying considerably depending on the department or region, and if less than 10% of suicides escape statistics in most regions according to this study, but they would be 22% in Rhône-Alpes and 46% in Île-de-France . According to the DREES, the recording of a medical cause of death sometimes masks suicide ("violent death undetermined as to intention"), and sometimes suspicious suicides lead to a judicial investigation, or the death can be declared "of unknown causes", or sometimes Inserm has not received a certificate.

=== By year ===
The suicide rate in France has changed since records began:

- From 1953 to 1976, the suicide rate was relatively stable, around 15.5 per 100,000 inhabitants;
- From 1977 to 1985, it increased steadily to reach 22.6 per 100,000 inhabitants;
- it has been decreasing steadily since (returning to 15.3 per 100,000 inhabitants in 2012 and continued declining towards 12.3 per 100,000 inhabitants in 2017).
- In 2022, a slight increase is observed with a rate of 14.2 per 100,000 inhabitants, or approximately 9,200 deaths, of which almost 75% concern men;
- In 2023, the rate decreases to 13.6 per 100,000 inhabitants, with 8,868 deaths recorded, confirming a downward trend despite regional disparities

=== By gender and sexual orientation ===
Suicide in France particularly affects young homosexual or bisexual men, who are 7 to 13 times more likely to commit suicide than heterosexual men. Similarly, a quarter of young people who have attempted suicide are homosexual. According to INSERM, approximately 650 deaths occur each year among 15-24 year-olds in France. Among these young people, two-thirds are boys. The suicide rate has fallen since 1985, but suicide attempts among 15-19 year-olds have increased (4.3% in 1999).

Women attempt suicide twice as often as men in France, but men's suicide attempts are three times more lethal than women's. Men account for 75% of suicides. Suicide is the leading cause of death among 15-35 year-olds, and the risk of suicide increases with age. Longitudinal studies show that 15% of depressed patients die by suicide. The suicide attempt rate decreases with age, while the suicide rate increases. According to the 2011 Inpes health barometer, 0.3% of men and 0.7% of women attempted suicide during the year. The survey also highlights the more frequent occurrence of suicidal thoughts during the year, which affects 3.4% of men and 4.4% of women. Women attempt suicide more often, but the outcome is less often fatal than men (who represent three-quarters of suicide deaths). This difference is partly explained by the methods used, which are more often medication for women and, for men, the use of firearms or hanging. The risk factors for suicide attempts and suicidal thoughts are above all depression, violence suffered, including sexual violence, even when it occurred a long time ago. Social isolation and social insecurity also appear to be important risk factors.

Among French adolescents who have attempted suicide, 25% are gay.

=== According to level of employment ===
According to the InVS, the suicide mortality rate is three times higher among employees and workers than among managers, and this rate varies according to the sector of employment. The health and social action sectors are the most affected (34.3/100,000), ahead of the public administration (excluding the state civil service) (29.8/100,000), construction (27.3/100,000) and real estate (26.7/100,000).

Furthermore, farmers and farm workers have a 12% higher risk of suicide than the general population. This risk is 28 per 100,000 for workers and 8 per 100,000 for those in higher intellectual professions. The situation for farmers is worsening year by year: one suicide every 3 days in 2016, the frequency shortened to 2 days in 2018.

The suicide rate in the gendarmerie is 36% higher than the average for the rest of the French population in 2017, in particular because the service weapon is used in half of the attempts.

Regarding national education personnel, the suicide rate was 5.85 cases per 100,000 in 2018-2019, according to the first official report from the Ministry of National Education .

That of doctors is relatively high, higher than that of the police, a phenomenon probably explained by sometimes very extended working hours and by professional solitude .

=== By age group ===
The suicide rate tends to increase with age (below, rate per 100,000 inhabitants in metropolitan France, 2017).

Age	TOTAL	<5	5 to 14	15 to 24	25 to 34	35 to 44	45 to 54	55 to 64	65 to 74	75 to 84	85 to 94	> 95
Suicide rate	12.6	0	0.3	4.1	9.1	14.9	20.5	18.2	16.2	22.5	34.1	27.7

In total, a third of suicide victims are over 65 years old. France is among the countries where suicide among the elderly is the highest.

Furthermore, the relatively low suicide rate among adolescents should not obscure the fact that it is the second leading cause of death among 15-24 year olds after road accidents .

=== By region ===
Suicide is the least common in Overseas France, and most common in Brittany. Men die of suicide much more often than women, especially at 45–49 years old and at 65–69 years old (in the case of Yonne).

Since the early 2000s, Indigenous communities in French Guiana have experienced a surge in suicides, and the rate is 10 to 20 times higher than in Metropolitan France.

=== International comparisons ===
In the OECD in 2017, the suicide rate is higher in France (13.1 per 100,000 in 2015) than in Italy (5.7), Spain (6.8), the United Kingdom (7.3), Germany (10.2), Sweden (11.1), Switzerland (11.2), Canada (11.8), Australia (11.9) and Austria (12.4). Suicide rates are, however, higher in the United States (13.9), Japan (15.2), Belgium (15.9), Hungary and South Korea (24.6).

Contrary to two preconceived ideas, at the beginning of the 1990s, suicide was more frequent among French adolescents than among Japanese ones ( 10.3 cases per 100,000 against 8.6) and the suicide rate was higher in France than in Sweden among men as among women.
