= 2009 swine flu pandemic in Europe =

Detected human cases in European countries
Country	Cases	Deaths
Country	Laboratory confirmed	Confirmed (Suspected)^{‡}
latest ECDC totals (world)^{†}		7,860
Total	500,000	2,889
Turkey	12,316	458
Russia	20,838	438
United Kingdom	27,464	457
Spain	22,379	232
Ukraine	85^{1}	16^{1}
France	5,126	196
Italy	3,593	178
Germany	203,713	122
Poland	2,024	116
Greece	8,768	52
Portugal	156,701	51
Netherlands	1,473	51
Serbia	520	41
Czech Republic	777	38
Hungary	283	37
Finland	6,122	36
Norway	12,654	29
Romania	4,979	29
Latvia	1,321	24
Bulgaria	766	23
Croatia	526	22
Denmark	651	21
Slovakia	171	21
Ireland	3,189	20
Sweden	2,130	20
Belarus	102	20
Moldova	1,024	15
Belgium	76,973	14
Macedonia	2,600	14
Lithuania	68	12
Slovenia	990	11
Kosovo	98	10
Switzerland	1,550	8
Bosnia and Herzegovina	558	7
Estonia	456	7
Austria	964	5
Malta	718	5
Georgia	604	5
Albania	310	3
Iceland	8,650	2
Luxembourg	333	2
Cyprus	297	2
Montenegro	119	2
Armenia	80	2
Azerbaijan	14	2
Jersey	234	0
Isle of Man	75	0
Akrotiri and Dhekelia	58	0
Faroe Islands	44	0
Monaco	36	0
Guernsey	17	0
Kazakhstan	17	0
Liechtenstein	13	0
San Marino	5	0
Andorra	1	0
Summary: Number of European countries with confirmed cases: 50; Number of European dependencies with confirmed cases: 6^{1}Since 18 November 2009 the Ukrainian ministry of health publishes no separate statistics on cases of A/H1N1 influenza or swine flu. According to the ministry as of 21 January 2010 1,019 people have died of flu and flu-like illnesses and its complications (pneumonia) in Ukraine.

The 2009 flu pandemic in Europe was part of a pandemic involving a new strain of influenza, subtype H1N1. H1N1 is commonly called swine flu. The pandemic infected at least 125,550 people in Europe. There were 458 confirmed deaths in Turkey, 438 confirmed deaths in Russia, and 457 confirmed deaths in the United Kingdom.

Multiple cases of narcolepsy developed in youth as the result of a vaccine. Because Sweden and Finland both only used Pandemrix, "an adjuvanted influenza A (H1N1) 2009 monovalent vaccine manufactured by GlaxoSmithKline", the narcolepsy was attributed to it. "In July 2011 the European Medicines Agency restricted the use of Pandemrix to people over 19 years old, as early evidence of the narcolepsy link emerged in Scandinavia." In 2013, the UK Health Protection Agency concluded that Pandemrix "was associated with a risk of one narcolepsy case for every 55,000 children vaccinated. The figures suggest that altogether about 700 cases of narcolepsy in children across Europe may be associated with Pandemrix." No link was found to narcolepsy in adults. In 2015, the UK vaccine damage scheme was forced to pay £120,000 to a seven-year-old boy who developed narcolepsy and was "left severely disabled by narcolepsy caused by the [Pandemrix] vaccine". More than 60 similarly affected others in the UK were eligible to be compensated through the Vaccine Damage Payment Act. Speculation developed that the powerful chemical adjuvant called AS03 was responsible. It was later found in 2019 that Pandemrix-induced narcolepsy is associated with genes related to immunity and neuronal survival.

Confirmed deaths Confirmed cases Suspect cases No cases	Community Outbreaks in Europe: Community Outbreaks
Europe Map by number of cases: 50 000+ confirmed cases 5 000+ confirmed cases 500+ confirmed cases 50+ confirmed cases 5+ confirmed cases 1+ confirmed cases	No deaths 1+ deaths 5+ deaths 10+ deaths 50+ deaths 100+ deaths 500+ deaths

== European Union ==
On 27 April 2009, the European Union health commissioner advised Europeans to avoid traveling to the United States or Mexico when possible. The same day, the first confirmed case of swine flu in the EU was announced in Spain.

The EU Commissioner for External Relations at the time, Benita Ferrero-Waldner, said on 27 April all travel to Mexico and the disinfecting of all airports in response to the global flu outbreak were being considered.

== Albania ==
On 20 July 2009, authorities in Albania reported the country's first positive case of swine flu. The infected person was a student from Gjirokastra, who tested positive to the virus. The student was later reported to have fully recovered from the flu. A few days later, three other cases were confirmed. The infected people, two sailors from the Philippines and one from Romania, were admitted to a Durrës city hospital. By 24 July, there were four cases of swine flu confirmed in Albania. On 3 December 2009, the first death from swine flu was confirmed in Albania.

By 10 January 2010, there were 426 confirmed cases of H1N1 in Albania, including 12 fatal cases. Two pregnant women, an 18-year-old from Kuçovë and a 25-year-old from Kukës, were among those who died.

== Austria ==
Outbreak evolution in Austria: Confirmed deaths Confirmed cases

Several possible cases in Austria had negative results. One test done on a 28-year-old woman from Vienna had a positive result. Austria was the 9th country affected by a confirmed case of swine flu. There are still two suspected cases being tested. As of 22 July 2009, 64 cases of H1N1 were confirmed in the country.

On 2 November 2009, an 11-year-old girl from Bozen died in the hospital of Innsbruck, becoming the first human victim of the virus in Austria.

== Belgium ==
Six suspected cases of swine flu in Belgium ultimately tested negative.

The Belgian interior ministry announced the first case of H1N1 flu in Belgium on 13 May 2009. The infected person was a 28-year-old man living in Ghent who had returned from a holiday in the United States. A second person tested positive for swine flu in Belgium on 14 May 2009. Two persons tested positive for A/H1N1 flu on 15 May 2009.

A sixth and seventh cases of swine flu were discovered on 21 May 2009. An eighth infection was reported on 26 May 2009.

By 22 July, a total of 126 cases had been confirmed. On 30 July, a woman from Hoogstraten became the first patient in Belgium to die of swine flu.

By 16 August, a total of 2353 cases had been confirmed. As of 18 October, five people had died as a consequence of swine flu it has been estimated that at least 2,010 were infected in Belgium. By 29 October, a total of 76,964 cases were confirmed and seven people had died.

By 25 March, a total of 214,531 cases had been confirmed, with 19 deaths

== Bosnia and Herzegovina ==
The first case was confirmed in Bosnia and Herzegovina on 29 June. On 16 November 2009 the first fatality in Bosnia and Herzegovina related to the H1N1 virus occurred. The 40-year-old man died in hospital in Mostar.

== Bulgaria ==
The first case of swine flu in Bulgaria was a person traveling from New York to Sofia on 27 May. The person developed respiratory problems, a cough and a high fever on 29 May.

On 30 September 2009 the first fatality related to the H1N1 virus in Sofia occurred. The 30-year-old man died in hospital in the Bulgarian capital.

== Croatia ==
On 29 April it was announced that a 22-year-old traveler from Florida had been held in quarantine in Osijek, Croatia under suspicion of swine flu. Later that day, however, the Director of Infectious Disease Epidemiology Agency, Dr. Ira Gjenero Margan, stated results of the testing for swine flu were negative "with 99% certainty". On 30 April, a child was held in quarantine in Zagreb but the results were negative. On 15 June, health minister Darko Milinovic confirmed the first case of swine flu in Croatia; however a few hours later he said that a laboratory in London, United Kingdom, had cross-contaminated the samples and thus created a false positive result, meaning that there were no infections in Croatia. The first case was Laboratory confirmed on 3 July. The patient was a 60-year-old woman, who came from Australia. On 31 October, a 61-year-old man from Split became the first patient in Croatia to die because of swine flu.

== Cyprus ==
Cyprus identified its first case of H1N1 on 30 May. The infected individual was a 39-year-old woman from Moldova, living in Cyprus, who had returned from the United States on 28 May. By 11 July, 250 cases had been confirmed in Cyprus. In the northern part of Cyprus, all the schools, universities and government offices were shut down for ten days. People were told not to leave their houses unless there was an emergency or it was urgent to do so.

== Czech Republic ==
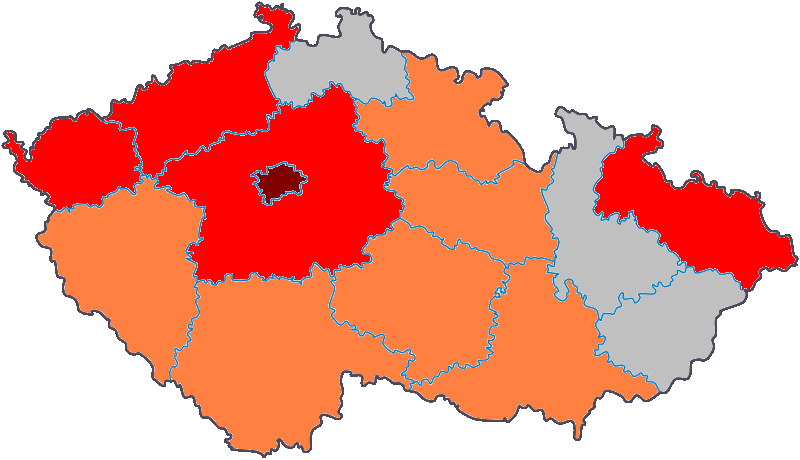
Outbreak evolution in the Czech Republic: 50+ cases 5+ cases 1+ cases

The Czech Republic confirmed its first case of swine flu on 25 May. The 29-year-old man was working as a pilot, and he had just returned from New York. He was held in quarantine in the hospital Bulovka in Prague.

By 5 August 2009, 135 Czechs had tested positive for swine flu.

== Denmark ==
Authorities confirmed on 1 May that a Danish citizen had tested positive for swine flu, making it the first reported case in Scandinavia.

By 11 June, a total of 11 cases had been confirmed, including a six-year-old boy.

On 29 June, the first case of Oseltamivir (Tamiflu) resistance in the world was announced.

On 28 August 2009, a truck driver from Pandrup, Denmark, died on duty in Norway. This was discovered by the other driver of the truck. They both had flu-symptoms, and when the living man from Pandrup arrived at Aalborg Sygehus, he tested positive for H1N1, although it is still not known if the passenger who died caused the flu.

In 2009, about 600 Danes tested positive for swine flu. Among them were two in isolation in Indonesia and the first known resistant case using tamiflu.

== Estonia ==
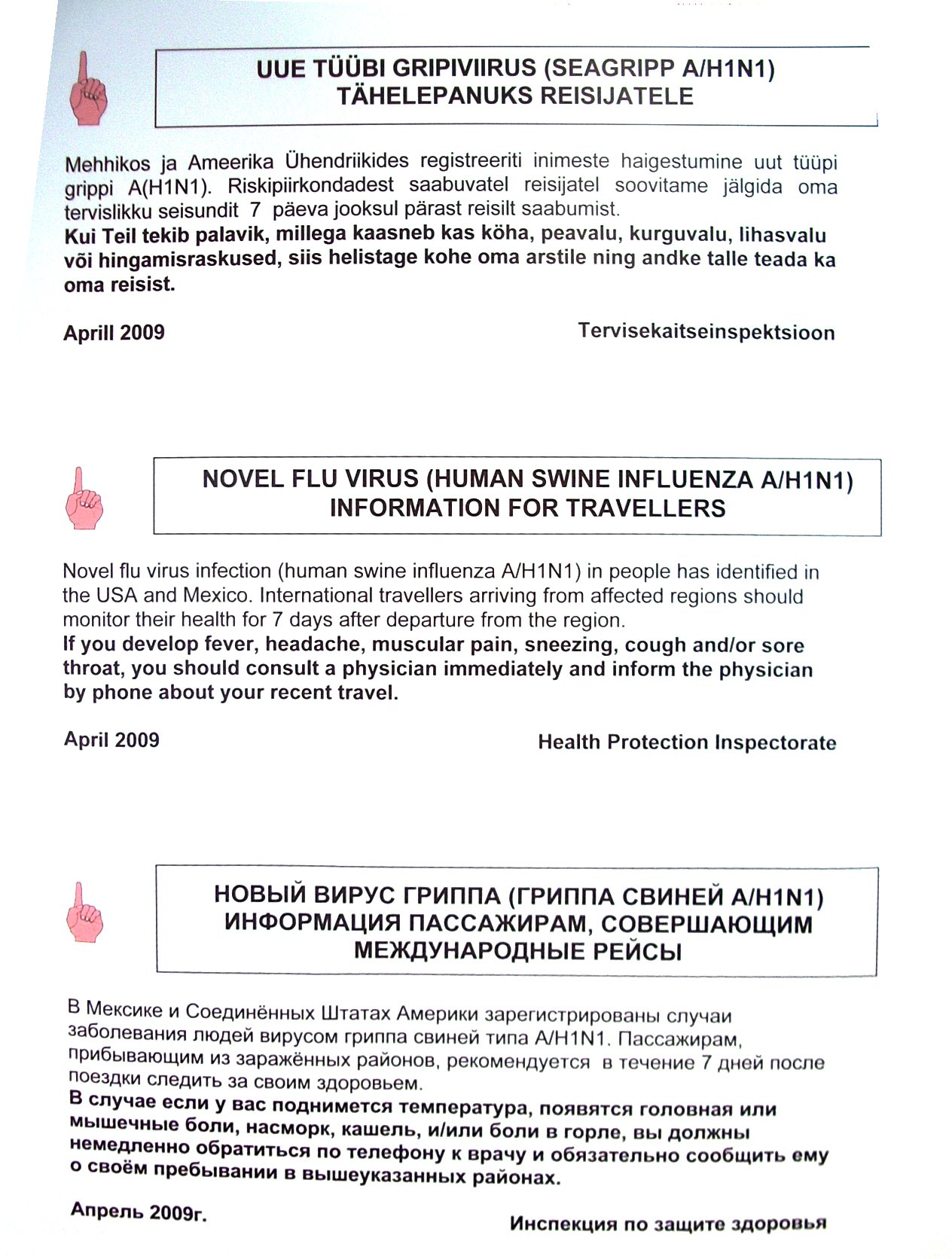
Health advisory issued by Estonian government

Outbreak evolution in Estonia (as of 23 November): Confirmed cases followed by death Confirmed cases Unconfirmed or suspected cases

The first case in Estonia was confirmed in a laboratory on 29 May. The patient was a 29-year-old man who had returned from the United States.

On 3 June, two new cases were laboratory confirmed.

On 7 June, a fourth case was confirmed. The patient was a person who also had returned from the United States on 4 June 2009.

Seven new cases were confirmed on 26 June. Two of the infected people came back from a trip to Mexico. The others were American students who were on a trip to Estonia with the U.S. Student Ambassador program, "People to People".

On 12 July, six new cases were confirmed.

On 17 July, a young Estonian football player was infected. He had returned from Finland after participating in U-19 European Championships. As of 17 July, there were 22 confirmed cases of A(H1N1).

On 28 July, Ivi Normet, Deputy Secretary General on Health of Ministry of Social Affairs of Estonia, speculated that in the worst-case scenario the swine flu could infect 500,000 Estonians in ten weeks. That's about 30% of the Estonian population.

As of 9 November 2009, there were 130 cases confirmed.

As of 11 November 2009, there were 172 cases of influenza A (H1N1) confirmed, in Harjumaa, Tartumaa, Viljandimaa, Võrumaa, Ida-Virumaa and Lääne-Virumaa.

Since 11 November, the Estonian Health Protection Inspectorate no longer recommends laboratory tests for all suspected cases of A(H1N1).

As of 13 November 2009, there were 79 new cases confirmed in one week. The total cases numbered 217.

As of 20 November 2009, there were 269 cases of influenza A (H1N1) confirmed in 10 counties: Harjumaa, Tartumaa, Viljandimaa, Võrumaa, Ida-Virumaa, Lääne-Virumaa, Jõgevamaa, Põlvamaa, Valgamaa and Pärnumaa.

On 23 November, the first death from swine flu occurred. The victim was a 13-year-old boy, living in the Harjumaa region.

On 29 November, the second death from swine flu occurred. The victim was a 50-year-old male. The total number of confirmed cases had reached 302.

On 4 December, another two deaths were confirmed; and the number of confirmed infections had reached 456.

By 6 January 2010, the number of cases was 808, with 13 deaths.

By 4 March 2010, there were 881 cases confirmed and 20 deaths.

== Finland ==
On 16 October 2009, the national broadcasting company YLE reported that the first epidemic wave of swine flu had hit Finland. The National Institute for Health and Welfare (THL) said that the H1N1 outbreaks in northern Finland were reaching epidemic proportions. THL also reported that by 16 October there were 377 confirmed cases in Finland.

The H1N1 strain of influenza was added to the official list of infectious diseases dangerous to public, ("yleisvaarallinen tartuntatauti"), which guarantees free-of-charge treatment to all residents and allows for involuntary quarantine, effective from 1 May 2009. From the beginning of August it was removed from the list, so free-of-charge treatment is no longer available to residents. Finland's first two H1N1 cases were confirmed on 12 May 2009 in the Helsinki metropolitan area. The first confirmed cases were traveling together in Mexico and came to Finland via Amsterdam on 6 May 2009.

According to a Finnish site tracking H1N1 cases, there were currently 1,425 confirmed cases as of 9 November 2009, and laboratory testing of every suspected case was stopped by August. Two serious cases were reported in Finland by 2 September. Thousands were infected in Lapland, northern Finland by 21 October.

On 24 October, a 25-year-old woman from Northern Ostrobothnia, who also had a chronic disease, died from H1N1 influenza. On 2 November, an 8-year-old previously healthy girl died from the disease. The girl and her parents had visited a doctor earlier, but were sent back home where the girl later died. According to some estimates, the total number of cases in Finland was probably 10,000–100,000.

A two-year-old girl died from the disease (13 November 2009). After publicity of the death of the two-year-old child, Finnish National Institute for Health and Welfare, THL, (13 November 2009) said they will no longer report deaths caused by H1N1.

== France ==
Outbreak evolution in France (updated 18 November 2009): Confirmed deaths Confirmed cases No reported cases

As of 28 April there were twenty suspected cases of swine flu being investigated in France. Since 25 April, over 100 cases of Influenza-like illness have been reported, of which 30 were identified as possible cases. 10 of those cases have since been excluded. On 30 April, the number of suspected cases was revised to 50 (including 4 probable cases).

On 1 May, the French Health Minister confirmed, during the 8pm TF1 news that two cases of A(H1N1) flu had been detected in France.

On 4 May, two new cases were confirmed, bringing the total number of people infected to 4.

On 6 May, a fifth case was confirmed in the Paris region. Two new cases were also confirmed at the end of the afternoon by the INVS (National Institute for Sanitary Watch), 7 are probable and 32 are suspected.

On 7 May, three new cases were announced by the National Institute for Sanitary Watch.

In November 2009, 351 cases were detected for each 100,000 inhabitants. Since August, it has been estimated that 1,980,000 persons were infected by the flu in metropolitan France. There were 43 deaths. (Rising to 70 if including overseas territories)

== Germany ==
Outbreak evolution in Germany: Confirmed cases followed by death Confirmed cases Unconfirmed or suspected cases

On 29 April, the first case of swine flu in Germany was confirmed by the Robert Koch Institute in the area of Regensburg. A 22-year-old woman from Hamburg was also confirmed to have been infected by swine flu during a trip to Mexico. A 37-year-old woman from Kulmbach was also confirmed to have become infected during a similar trip.

On 1 May, Robert Koch Institute confirmed the first case of human-to-human spreading of swine flu in Munich. A nurse was infected from having contact with infected patients. At approx. 10:00 she claimed to be already healed. At the time of 13:00 one further infection in Bavaria was confirmed, but the patient also claimed to be healthy again.

On 2 May, a new human-to-human infection, in the same hospital in Munich, was confirmed. The new patient, who was in the same room with the original infected German that came from Mexico, is currently being reported to show no signs of the new influenza strain anymore.

On 3 May, two further cases of swine flu in Brandenburg were reported. Two people from the same flight as patient in Hamburg were also infected.

On 5 May, one new case in Saxony-Anhalt was confirmed, bringing the total number of people infected to 9.

On 7 May, another new case in Saxony-Anhalt was reported.

On 8 May, an adult male living in Bavaria who had recently been to the USA contracted swine flu.

On 11 May, the case of a 27-year-old Bavarian woman, who stayed for some weeks in Mexico and medicated patients in a hospital, was reported.

On 15 May, two more cases were reported, a female human and her son from Saxony-Anhalt. They were infected by her husband / his father, who had returned from Mexico.

On 21 May, a case was found in a 43-year-old woman from Düsseldorf in North Rhine-Westphalia who had returned from New York. One day later, Robert Koch Institute confirmed that her husband had tested positive with swine influenza too. Furthermore, their six-year-old daughter, who did not stay in New York, had been infected by her parents, bringing the total to 17.

Up until 5 June 2009, the total number of confirmed cases increased to 49. Most of them were recent travelers to Mexico, the USA or the UK. There was also a single-digit number of isolated in-country-transmissions.

== Greece ==
On 19 May 2009 the authorities confirmed the first case of swine flu in Greece. The infected person was a 10-year-old American child who lived in Connecticut and who flew to Greece a few days before. He was hospitalised at Sismanogleion but was not gravely ill. The authorities have contacted many of the passengers who sat near this patient on the plane and are examining them for suspicious symptoms. At this point in time Greece has enough anti-virals to cover 12% of the population (at least 10% is the amount proposed by the EU directives). The 10-year-old is now out of the hospital and none of the passengers in his flight are infected.

On 27 May 2009 the first case in Northern Greece was announced.

On 29 May 2009 the fourth case was announced.

On 14 June 2009 the total number of cases have reached 20 and on 17 June 2009 reached 25. On 9 July 2009 the total number of cases reached 216 out of whom 93 have fully recovered.

On 13 July 2009 the total number of cases reached 290, of which 128 have fully recovered

On 14 July 2009 the total number of cases reached 323 of which 200 have fully recovered

On 16 September 2009 the total number of cases reached 2149.

On 14 December 2009 the total number of deaths in Greece increased to 51

On 30 December 2009 71 people in Greece have died from H1N1.

== Hungary ==
On 29 May 2009, a case involving a Brazilian man was confirmed. The infected man, later recovered and left the country. On 18 June three new cases of swine flu were confirmed in Hungary: a married couple who returned from New York, and a man who came back from London.

== Iceland ==
Outbreak evolution in Iceland: Confirmed deaths Confirmed cases No reported cases

The first case of A(H1N1) in Iceland was reported on 23 May 2009. The infected person came to the country from New York and got sick shortly after he arrived in Iceland. The second case was announced on 9 June. The infected was a male in the Capital Region who also had arrived from the United States. As of 6 August there are 54 cases of H1N1 in Iceland.

Iceland is currently being briefed by the WHO and is cooperating closely with ECDC, CDC and the EU in terms of monitoring and response. Initially the directorate of health warned people traveling to Mexico and the United States (especially California and Texas) to exercise caution and to contact a doctor immediately if they started showing symptoms of swine flu but on 28 April people traveling to Mexico were advised to cancel their trip unless it's very urgent.

On 28 April, it was announced that passengers arriving in Iceland from the United States or Mexico would be monitored and will undergo medical examination even if the slightest signs of influenza are detected.

Iceland has stocks of Tamiflu and Relenza for one-third of its population.

In a risk assessment made by the Icelandic government in 2008 in case of an influenza pandemic two scenarios are envisioned:

- A worst-case scenario where 50% of the Icelandic population are infected and 3% of the infected population die.
- A milder scenario where precautionary measures prevent infection, 25% of the Icelandic population are infected and 1% die.

== Ireland ==
Latest details on cases of the swine flu (H1N1) in Ireland was found on the Health Service Executive website. As of 29 June 2009 there were 39 cases in Ireland.

Ireland has over two million doses of anti-virals and a pandemic plan in place.

- 2 May – the Department of Health announced the first confirmed case in Ireland, an adult male living in Dublin who had recently been to Mexico.
- 25 May—31 May – three more cases were confirmed.
- 2 June – three new cases were confirmed by the HSE on people who returned recently from New York, The total number of cases as of this date was 7.
- 19 June – a case of human swine flu was discovered in a seven-year-old, who was attending a primary school in County Mayo and had been abroad. 28 children in the school were treated with Tamiflu. The total number of cases as of this date was 18.
- 21 June – a child believed to have recently returned from the United States of America and presenting flu-like symptoms was treated in Kerry General Hospital in Tralee, County Kerry, but tests later proved negative.
- 4 July
  - A free swine flu vaccination is to be offered to the general population in the coming months, as part of a major plan to avoid the worst effects of a global pandemic.
  - The HSE plans to acquire over 7,500,000 doses of the vaccine, at a cost of almost €90 million.
  - The jabs would be administered by GPs or through a network of over a hundred swine flu clinics and will be ready by the autumn.
  - 12 new cases of swine flu were confirmed here yesterday, bringing the total number in Ireland to 63.
- 10 July – Total number of laboratory confirmed cases in Ireland exceed 100. 9 of these cases are believed to have been in-country transmissions of the virus.
- 21 July – 11 new cases of the H1N1 virus have been identified in Ireland bringing the total number of confirmed cases to 164 including 17 cases which are believed to have been in-country transmissions of the virus.
- 28 July – According to the HSE, there are reportedly 276 confirmed cases in Ireland. A man in his 30s is critically ill in St James's Hospital in Dublin with human swine flu (H1N1). The man, who is originally from Bratislava in Slovakia, was admitted to hospital late last week. He has been working in Ireland for several years.

Around 1,500 people visited GPs last week with suspected swine flu, three times more than the most recent figures released.

Director of the Health Protection Surveillance Centre Dr Darina O'Flanagan said the figure was included in the latest data from the Irish College of General Practitioners.

It represents 37 people per 100,000 and is three times more than figures released yesterday by the Department of Health.

The department said laboratory tests have confirmed 278 cases of the H1N1 virus have been reported but the actual number exceeds that total as family doctors report an increase in the number of cases they have been diagnosing in recent weeks.

Two patients who contracted human swine flu (H1N1) are still being treated in intensive care units.

Chief Medical Officer Tony Holohan said that the HSE expects some deaths from the virus, and further hospitalisations, over the coming weeks and months.

Dr Holohan said 12 people have been hospitalised so far.

A man in his 30s, who was admitted to St James's Hospital last week, remains 'critically ill' with the virus.

It is believed the man, who is originally from Bratislava in Slovakia, contracted the virus abroad. He has been living in Ireland for several years.

The hospital said that all necessary precautions were being taken and that the Health Service Executive and the Department of Health were being fully informed.

- 7 August
  - A young Irish woman has died from human swine flu today at Tallaght Hospital in Dublin. She is the first person to die from the virus here since the first cases emerged in this country in May.
  - Department of Health officials said that the woman had an underlying medical condition.
- 17 August – The second death due to the swine flu virus has been reported. The victim is believed to have been living in the east of the country. The death toll currently stands at nine.
- 1 October – two further deaths were announced, bringing the total fatalities to four.

As of 5 January 2010, there had been 3,189 cases and 22 deaths in Ireland from the swine flu.

== Italy ==
Outbreak evolution in Italy: Confirmed deaths Confirmed cases

A woman who returned from San Diego was hospitalised in Venice for suspected swine flu.

By 30 April 2009, about 20 suspected cases of swine flu were being monitored in Italy.

On 2 May 2009, Reuters confirmed that Italy had a case of swine flu. It was recorded in a 50-year-old man in Massa after he returned from Mexico City. He, however, had very mild symptoms (i.e. aches, coughing, but no fever) and was recovering well.

On 26 July 2009, the number of swine flu cases was 618, with community outbreaks contributing to the number.

On 4 September 2009 the first death was confirmed in Italy. On 19 September of the same year the second death was confirmed.

== Kosovo ==
On 24 July, the authorities in Kosovo announced that the samples of three suspected cases had been sent to the laboratory for analysis. According to the authorities, the three cases had had contact with other people who were infected by the A/H1N1 virus. Two of them had previously visited Switzerland and Sweden, and one of them was in the United Kingdom.

On 28 July, the results of these three suspected cases showed that only the person, who recently was in the United Kingdom, was infected with swine flu. This person was a 9-year-old child, living in the United Kingdom, who along with the family came to spend their vacation in Kosovo. The family arrived to the Pristina Airport from London, and during the flight, health inspectors recommended the child to see a doctor, once they arrived to Pristina.

On 14 November, a first death was confirmed in Kosovo.

On 28 December there were 14 A/H1N1 confirmed victims in Kosovo.

== Latvia ==
On 21 June, a woman, who had just returned from North America, was hospitalized in Latvia. Symptoms were observed already when she was still on a plane. It was later confirmed that she has swine flu. It was the first registered case in Latvia.

In early November, after severe outbreaks in Russia and Ukraine, the people suffering from the flu increased. On 5 November, there were 10 new cases registered, increasing the total number of cases to 63. Just four days later, on 9 November, the number reached 89 cases and the first death of H1N1 in Latvia was confirmed. As more people got precautious and the pharmacies weren't supplied enough, the next day, for a short period of time, they ran out of any prophylactic drugs against influenza. On 11 November the number of registered cases reached 132. The next day, with another 33 new cases, the total number had reached 165 people.

== Lithuania ==
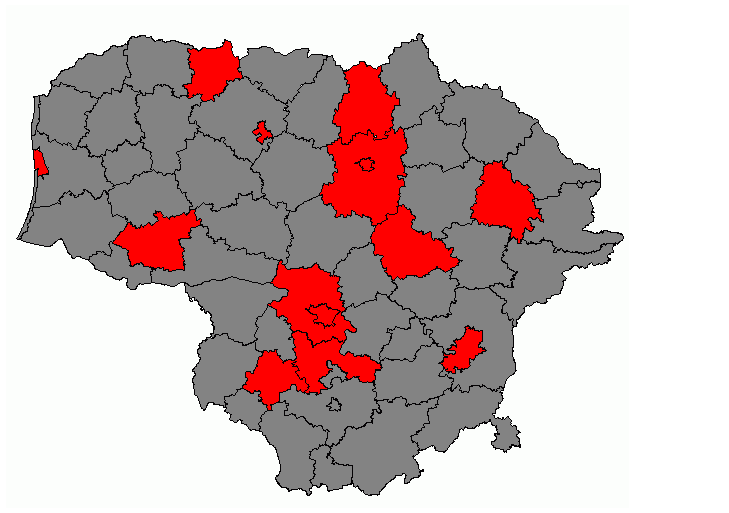
As of 15 August, confirmed swine influenza cases in Lithuanian districts: Deaths Confirmed cases Suspected cases

On 26 June Lithuania confirmed country's first influenza A (H1N1) in Tauragė (diagnosed by Lithuanian AIDS Centre).

On 2 July Lithuania confirmed two more cases of influenza A (H1N1), in Tauragė and Vilnius. Total number of cases – 3.

On 7 July Lithuania confirmed two more cases of influenza A (H1N1), in Vilnius region. Total number of cases – 5.

As of 11 July 2009, there was 25 possible cases. Not all of the 25 cases were confirmed.

On 16 July Lithuania confirmed two more cases of influenza A (H1N1), in Vilnius region. Total number of cases – 7.

On 23 July Lithuania confirmed three more cases of influenza A (H1N1), in Vilnius, Marijampolė and Kaunas region. Total number of cases – 10.

On 27 July Lithuania confirmed two more cases of influenza A (H1N1), in Vilnius region. Total number of cases – 12.

On 29 July Lithuania confirmed three more cases of influenza A (H1N1). Total number of cases – 15.

On 31 July Lithuania confirmed seven more cases of influenza A (H1N1), in Vilnius, Panevėžys, Klaipėda, Kaunas, Prienai regions. Total number of cases – 22.

As of 8 August 2009, there was 29 cases. Lithuania confirmed eight more cases of influenza, from Kaunas, Vilnius, Ukmergė rajono and Utena region. One of the infected – an Israeli citizen, came to Lithuania.

On 11 August, Lithuania confirmed six more cases of influenza A (H1N1), in Vilnius, Panevėžys, Pasvalys, Prienai regions. Total number of cases – 35.

On 13 August, Lithuania confirmed five more cases of influenza A (H1N1), in Akmenė and Šiauliai. Total number of cases – 40.

Between 14 and 22 August, Lithuania confirmed seven more cases of influenza A (H1N1). Total number of cases – 47.

As of 30 August 2009, there were 48 cases. Lithuania confirmed one more case of influenza.

As of 7 September 2009, there were 51 cases. Lithuania confirmed three more cases of influenza.

As of 3 November 2009, there was 57 cases. Lithuania confirmed six more cases of influenza.

As of mid-November there was 68 cases. Lithuania confirmed eleven more cases of influenza.

As of 15 November, there were 127 confirmed cases of influenza.

As of 18 November, the first death of swine influenza was reported. The victim was a 14-year-old boy, living in Kaunas region.

As of 23 November, the second death of swine influenza was reported. The victim was a 40-year-old male, living in Visaginas.

On 24 November, an epidemic is announced in the whole of Lithuania.

As of 28 November, the third death of swine influenza was reported. The victim was a 30-year-old female, living in Šiauliai.

As of 30 November, the fourth death of swine influenza was reported. The victim was a 45-year-old female, living in Varėna.

As of 1 December, the fifth death of swine influenza was reported. The victim was a 46-year-old male, living in Vilnius.

As of 2 December, the sixth death of swine influenza was reported. The victim was a 40-year-old male, living in Kaunas.

== Luxembourg ==
On 2 June, the first case of swine flu was detected in Luxembourg.

On 17 September, the first death relative to swine flu was reported in Luxembourg.

On 18 October 785 people were confirmed to have swine flu.

On 16 November, a second person died of swine flu.

== Macedonia ==
On 27 April 2009, the government of the Republic of Macedonia prohibited all exports and imports of live pigs. Even though Macedonia is not affected from swine flu, the government ordered a ten days health monitoring period for everybody that comes from an affected country.

On 4 July, Macedonia confirmed the first two cases of virus A/H1N1. As of 8 December 2009, 9 death cases due to complications from the swine flu have been recorded in Macedonia.

As of 29 December 2009, 18 death cases have been confirmed in Macedonia.

== Malta ==
On 2 July 2009, two men were diagnosed with swine flu after a holiday in Girona, Spain. Malta had so far been the only country in European Union without swine flu cases. On 3 July 2009, 14 more cases were reported, bringing the total to 16. Most cases of swine flu in Malta have been mild, with only two hospital admissions as of 6 July 2009, when there were 24 confirmed cases. Ironically the largest number of cases have occurred in Għarb, Gozo; one of the smallest villages on the islands. On Tuesday 18 August the first death was reported; by then the total cases had increased to 244. On 3 September two deaths from the flu were confirmed. The first death, an 82-year-old-woman, had a chronic disease whereas the second death, a 63-year-old-man, had chronic health problems. The third death, a 32-year-old-woman from Spain, that died at San Pawl il-Baħar area. In December 2010 a 70-year-old British woman died while she was in Malta for a holiday.

== Moldova ==
As of 10 November 2009, there are 132 confirmed cases, and 3 confirmed deaths in Moldova.

== Monaco ==
Monaco had reported its first confirmed case of swine flu on 17 June. The victim is a young Monegasque who returned from the United States. He was put in the isolation unit of L'archet Hospital.

== Montenegro ==
On 1 December 2009, the first case of death due to swine flu was confirmed in Montenegro. Since then, there were a total of 4 fatalities. On 17 December, the Government of Montenegro declared a swine flu epidemic for the whole territory of the country. The only municipalities without any confirmed cases are Žabljak, Šavnik and Rožaje.

== Netherlands ==
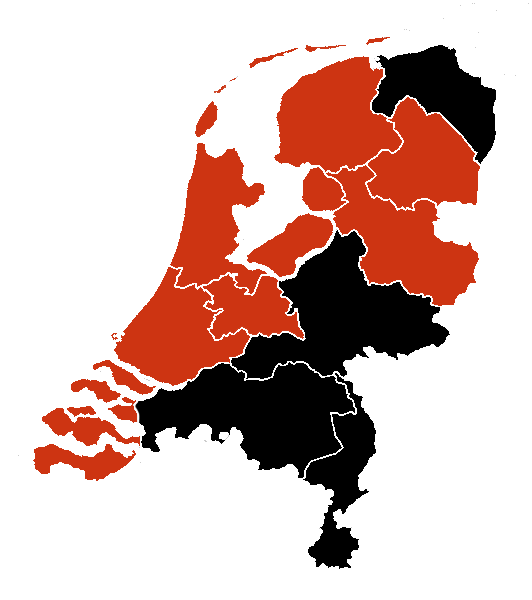
Confirmed deaths Confirmed cases Suspect cases No cases

The Netherlands National Institute for Public Health and the Environment advised any traveller who returned from Mexico since 17 April and developed a fever of 38.5 degrees Celsius (101.3 degrees Fahrenheit) within four days of arriving in the Netherlands to stay at home. On 30 April 2009 a three-year-old child tested positive for swine flu. The child returned from Mexico to the Netherlands on 27 April 2009. The parents tested negative to swine flu. The girl was very ill at first according to her parents, but made a full recovery. On 7 May a second case and a day later a third case of swine flu in the Netherlands were announced, concerning a 53-year-old woman and a 52-year-old man, respectively. Both of them had returned from Mexico recently and are being treated with Tamiflu. The woman made a full recovery, the man is doing well. There are no connections between each of the three cases. People who were seated close to the infected people in the plane were contacted and are being treated with Tamiflu as a precautionary measure. On 3 July, there were 134 confirmed cases in the Netherlands. The number rose to 273 on 24 July and to 517 on 31 July. On 4 August the first person died (after being sick already), and the number of infected people rose to 912 on 7 August. Only 20% of the patients have contracted the flu within the Netherlands. Many of the sick are people who fell ill during or after their holidays in countries like Spain, Greece and the United Kingdom. On 6 November the Netherlands National Institute for Public Health and the Environment reported there are 5 more cases of death (this brings the total to 17) and that there is an epidemic, which means more than 51 per 100,000 inhabitants contracted the flu, more than 2 weeks in a row. On 4 December the number of fatalities rose to 42. On 4 January 2011, it was confirmed that another 2 children died of swine flu. One of them would be a 4-year-old girl. They both lived in the region of Nijmegen, Gelderland. They died on 20 and 27 December 2010. There would be no link between the deaths.

== Norway ==
Outbreak evolution in Norway: 500+ cases 50+ cases 5+ cases 1+ cases

The Norwegian Institute of Public Health (FHI) updates their homepage with information about the swine flu outbreak in Norway every day at 10:00 (UTC).

On 9 May, two Norwegian students from Oslo and Telemark, were confirmed to be infected with swine flu after they came home from studies in Mexico. None of them became seriously ill and they are recovering quickly. A member of one of their families is suspected of being infected as well. One of them (the 20-year-old man from Oslo) have been confirmed completely recovered. These are the first two cases of swine influenza in Norway. By the end of May, there were a total number of 7 infected in Norway.

On 4 June, a Norwegian woman from Vest-Agder who recently had been to the United States was confirmed with the swine influenza. The infected woman is recovering well. This is the ninth confirmed case of swine influenza. By the end of June, the total number of infected by influenza A H1N1 rose to 33.

As of 20 July, The Norwegian Institute of Public Health (FHI) reports a total of 133 infected. 115 were infected abroad and 18 in Norway. Influenza A H1N1 has now reached 16 out of 19 fylker (counties). Most cases are found in Oslo (42), and in Sør-Trøndelag (30). So far, swine flu has not been registered in Finnmark, Nord-Trøndelag and in Hedmark

As of 24 July 197 cases in 18 out of 19 fylker (counties). Most cases are found in Oslo (60), and in Sør-Trøndelag (36). So far, swine flu has not been registered in Hedmark.

As of 19 November 23 deaths were reported in Norway.

On 22 October, it was confirmed by authorities that over 100,000 people in Norway had been infected with swine flu. 14 people are reported dead by 29 October.

== Poland ==
Outbreak evolution in Poland: Confirmed deaths Confirmed cases

Polish Chief Sanitary Inspectorate (GIS) maintains a webpage on the epidemic situation in Poland which includes weekly updates on influenza A/H1N1 outbreak. As of 4 November, it confirmed 187 cases, but there were no death cases.

The Polish Foreign Ministry issued a statement on 25 April recommending that citizens avoid travel to affected areas until the outbreak is totally contained.

On 13 November, a 37-year-old man died in Gdańsk. It was first death of patient with A/H1N1 in Poland.

As of 9 December, there were 1,525 cases and 67 deaths. Number of patients with A/H1N1 could be underestimated because it shows only laboratory confirmed cases.

Between May 2009 and May 2010, there were 2,798 cases of laboratory-confirmed A(H1N1)pdm09 influenza resulting in 181 deaths registered in Poland.

== Portugal ==
Outbreak evolution in Portugal: Confirmed deaths Confirmed cases

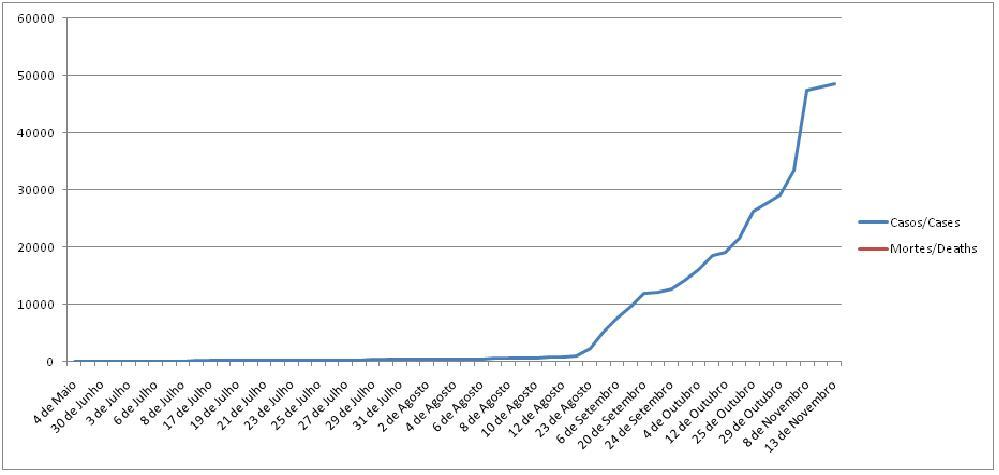
Graph of cases and deaths in Portugal

As of 4 May, there has been one confirmed case in Lisbon, Portugal, but it did not represent any concern, because the risk of transmission was no longer present at that time.

On 1 June, Ana Jorge, the Portuguese Health Minister, has confirmed the second case in Portugal, a 33-year-old man who travelled from the United States, first landing in Frankfurt, Germany. The case was reported at São João Hospital, Porto. On 30 June, five new cases were announced in Portugal elevating the total number of cases to 18.

As of 2 July there have been 27 confirmed cases in Portugal.

On 3 July 6 more cases were reported, making a total of 33 cases. As of 4 July, more 5 cases were confirmed, two of them internal transmissions (one in Azores, and the other one in Lisbon).

On 6 July, there have been confirmed 48 cases in Portugal.

As of 7 July, another 12 people infected were confirmed, making a total of 57 cases in the country. On this day, the first school was closed down for prevention, in Lisbon, as well as a kindergarten in Azores.

On 8 July 4 more cases were confirmed, including the first in Braga district, making the total cases 61.

As of 14 July, there are a total of 96 confirmed cases in Portugal. On this day, it was also announced that Faro's Hospital will join, on 15 July, the set of hospitals in the country capable of receiving patients infected with the A/H1N1 flu virus.

Government officials state the worst-case scenario in Portugal is 25% infection with a mortality of 0.1% totaling 8700 casualties in Portugal.

As of 23 August there have been 2244 people infected with the flu in Portugal.

Portugal has the second higher tie of infections in Europe. 20,9 cases per 100,000 persons.

On 13 September 2009, Portugal had 9618 cases officially confirmed.

In total, as of 24 September, there were 12709 cases confirmed in Portugal and the first death was confirmed on the same day.

As of 4 December, there were 121,677 cases confirmed and 24 deaths.

== Romania ==
Outbreak evolution in Romania: Confirmed deaths Confirmed cases Suspected cases No reported cases

In Sâmbăteni, Arad County, Romania, a child of a year and six months and his mother who recently returned from a trip to Portugal and Spain were suspected of having contracted influenza A(H1N1). Tests returned negative.

On Wednesday, 27 May a woman returning from America was confirmed with swine flu in Bucharest.

As of 11 August, there were 227 confirmed cases in 22 out of 41 counties of Romania.

By mid-September the number of cases in Romania had risen to 296.

As of 2 November 2009 the number of cases was 555. No deaths.

As of 10 November 2009 the number of cases was 1,001. No deaths.

As of 19 November 2009 the number of cases was 1,651. No deaths.

The first confirmed case of death came on November, 23rd.

As of 4 December 2009 the number of cases was 3,660 and 8 deaths.

As of 5 December 2009 the number of cases was 3,793 and 10 deaths.

As of 6 December 2009 the number of cases was 3,842 and 12 deaths. Health authorities have decided to suspend classes for 7 days, starting Monday, 7 December needle, these educational units: High School "Sabin Dragoi", Deva; High School "Miko", Sfântu Gheorghe and Group School "Avram Iancu", Târgu Mureş.

As of 7 December 2009 the number of cases was 3,881 and 12 deaths.

As of 8 December 2009 the number of cases was 3,998 and 14 deaths.

As of 9 December 2009 the number of cases was 4,113 and 14 deaths.

As of 15 December 2009 the number of cases was 4,885 and 27 deaths.

As of 24 December 2009 the number of cases was 5,421 and 42 deaths. As of 29 December 2009 the number of cases was 5568 and 52 deaths.

On 5 January 2010, actor Toni Tecuceanu from Cronica Cârcotaşilor died morning at around 3.00, the Hospital "Matei Balş" in Bucharest, following complications from lung after contracted the virus A/H1N1. Prof. dr. Secretary of State for Health, said the actor, aged 37 years and suffering from obesity.

As of 8 January 2010 the number of cases was 6,061 and 82 deaths.

As of 25 January 2010 the number of cases was 6,873 and 111 deaths.

As of 9 February 2010 the number of cases was 6,982 and 120 deaths.

As of 26 February 2010 the number of cases was 7,003 and 122 deaths.

As of 9 April 2010 the number of cases was 7,008 and 122 deaths.

== Russia ==
Reported deaths by federal subjects
Federal subjects	Confirmed cases	Confirmed deaths
Total	25,339	604
Adygea	115	4
Altai	236	21
Amur	103	9
Arkhangelsk	150	1
Astrakhan	123	17
Bashkortostan	43	6
Belgorod		1
Bryansk	85	5
Buryatia	722	3
Chelyabinsk	207	10
Chita	235	8
Chuvashia	73	1
Dagestan	386	8
Irkutsk	207	12
Ivanovo	198	17
Kabardino-Balkaria	51	0
Kamchatka	54	1
Kalmykia	119	3
Kaliningrad	90	0
Kaluga	64	3
Karachay–Cherkessia	460	2
Karelia	66	6
Khabarovsk	537	6
Khakassia	85	10
Kirov	699	15
Komi	11	1
Krasnodar	78	8
Krasnoyarsk	1,460	8
Kursk	218	8
Leningrad		4
Lipetsk	244	11
North Ossetia	49	1
Magadan	485	1
Mari El	500	12
Mordovia	75	6
Moscow	82	6
City of Moscow	1,841	14
Murmansk	208	5
Nizhny Novgorod	790	25
Novosibirsk	292	8
Omsk	193	4
Orenburg	159	5
Oryol	103	4
Penza	66	6
Perm	411	6
Primorsky	58	1
Pskov	149	14
Rostov	326	13
Ryazan	240	2
Sakhalin	120	1
Samara		2
Saratov	5,049	42
Sakha		1
Smolensk	159	8
St. Petersburg	959	1
Sverdlovsk	965	11
Tambov	105	6
Tatarstan	538	3
Tomsk	813	28
Tver	172	3
Tula	152	1
Tuva		2
Vladimir	301	17
Volgograd	532	20
Vologda	114	7
Voronezh	480	16
Udmurt	347	13
Ulyanovsk	111	10
Yamalia	114	2
Yaroslavl	260	11
Zabaykalsky	875	57

Outbreak evolution in Russia: Confirmed deaths Confirmed cases

Russia has banned the import of pork meat from Guatemala, Honduras, Dominican Republic, Colombia, Costa Rica, Cuba, Nicaragua, Panama, El Salvador, 9 US States (Alabama, Arizona, Arkansas, Georgia, Kansas, Louisiana, New Mexico, Oklahoma and Florida) and all types of meat and meat products from Mexico and 5 US States (California, Texas, Kansas, New York and Ohio).

The President instructed the regional governors to take urgent steps to prevent swine flu from spreading to Russia. Dmitry Medvedev also instructed the presidential plenipotentiary envoys in the federal districts to personally supervise the preventive measures to ensure the disease did not spread [in Russia] and stipulated monthly reports on the situation.

On 1 May officials confirmed that two women who came from USA trip were suspected to have swine flu. Currently both are in hospital for further treatment. As on 2 May, both tourists are reported not to be infected with new strain.

== Serbia ==
Outbreak evolution in Serbia: Confirmed deaths Confirmed cases

A 71-year-old tourist from Texas asked to be tested for swine flu at the Provincial hospital in Novi Sad, Serbia on 30 April. The results were negative.

The first confirmed case in Serbia was announced on 24 June. The infected person is a 29-year-old male citizen of Montenegro living in Belgrade who came back from a trip to Argentina two days earlier. As he travelled across Croatia and Germany with other people, they were put in semi quarantine. The second case was confirmed on 25 June. The infected person is a 4-year-old female citizen of Australia who was visiting Sombor. She had contact with 13 people whose health is being monitored. On 26 June, three more cases were confirmed, out of which two were independent cases while one patient was infected from contact with the previously diagnosed patient. In total 44 people were put under quarantine surveillance. On 28 June 6 more cases were confirmed – three were citizens of Canada, a mother and her 2- and 5-year-old daughters, two were tourists returning from Australia and Egypt and one was infected from contact with the first flu case patient in Serbia. Four more cases were confirmed on 1 July, one of the patients is a 73-year-old US citizen, while two patients arrived from abroad, from Australia and the USA. On 2 July, an Australian sportsman was diagnosed with flu. On 6 July, the total number of infected patients rose to 26 with two more cases among the Universiade athletes, one from Uganda and one from Argentina. On 7 July, four more cases were confirmed with a total number of 30 cases in Serbia. On 8 July four more cases were confirmed with a total number of 34 cases.

International events held in Serbia, 2009 Summer Universiade sport competition and EXIT music festival, led to a sudden increase to over 100 cases of flu in mid-July.

On 21 October 2009 the first fatality related to the H1N1 in Serbia. The 46-year-old woman died in hospital in Kragujevac.

As of 10 November, there are 258 people infected, and 7 death cases.

On 16 November, there are 295 officially confirmed cases, with 11 people died as consequence of swine flu infection.

== Slovenia ==
First confirmed infection was confirmed on 19 June; a female who flew from New York to Venice and then drove by car to Slovenia. Institute of Public Health of the Republic of Slovenia has established a web site with information about H1N1 induced influenza. Status of this webpage is updated once a week. As of 28 January 2010, there were 2091 people tested positive.

== Spain ==
Outbreak evolution in Spain: Confirmed deaths Confirmed cases

On 27 April the Spanish Ministry of Health and Social Policy announced that a man in Castilla-La Mancha, Spain who had recently returned from Mexico had contracted the disease. The man, aged 23, had returned from Mexico on 22 April and had been quarantined on the 25th. This was the first confirmed case in Europe.

The Spanish government is also observing other 35 possible swine flu cases in the Basque Country, Catalonia, the Balearic Islands, Andalusia, Murcia, Madrid and the Valencian Community.

AENA, the Spanish state owned company who manages all Spanish airports and Air Traffic Control established a protocol for the flights coming from and to Spain from the affected areas. Three patients who had just returned from Mexico were under observation in multiple regions of Spain.

== Sweden ==
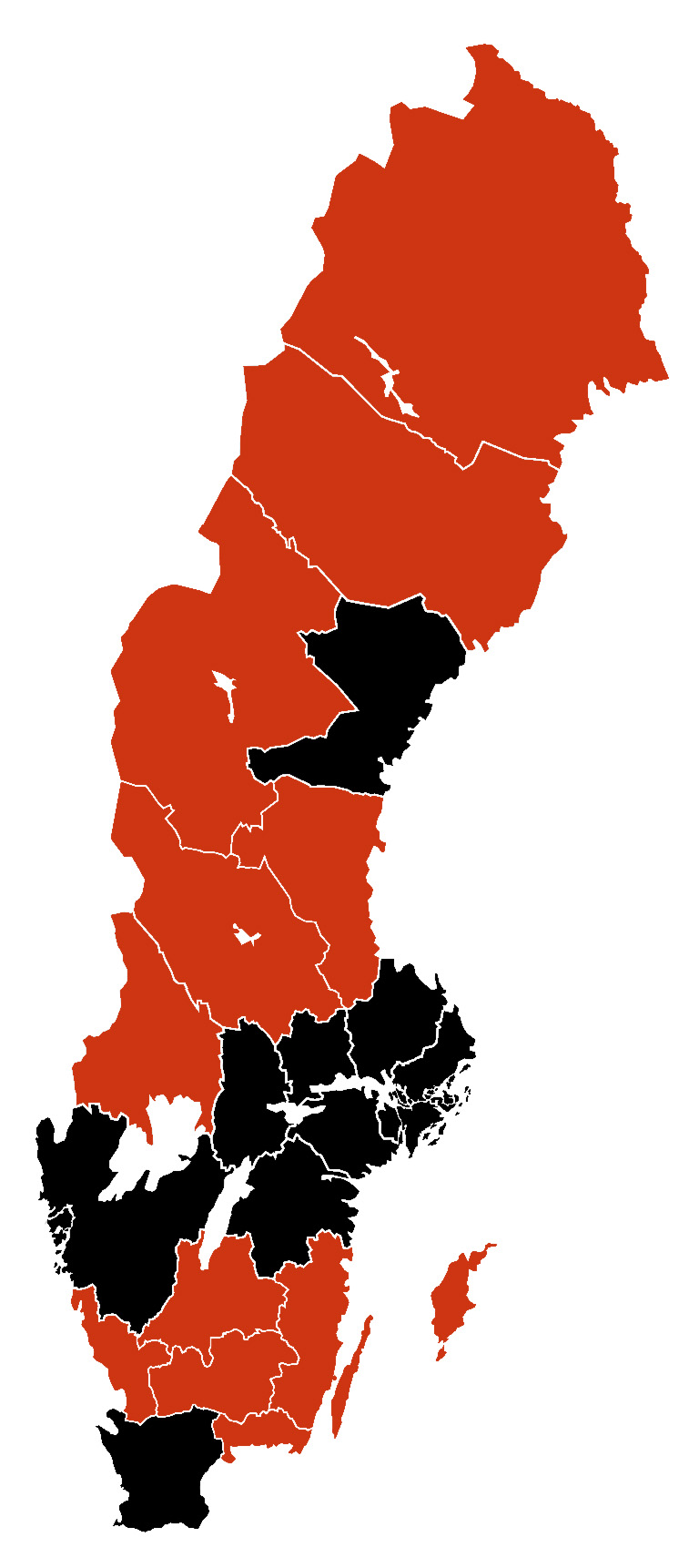
Outbreak evolution in Sweden: Confirmed deaths Confirmed cases

Reported cases by counties
County	Confirmed cases (deaths)
Total	10985 (26)
Blekinge	127
Dalarna	269
Gotland	40
Gävleborg	233
Halland	171
Jämtland	245
Jönköping	213
Kalmar	203
Kronoberg	168
Norrbotten	180
Skåne	1263 (3)
Stockholm	3285 (9)
Södermanland	379 (2)
Uppsala	459 (2)
Värmland	362
Västerbotten	542
Västernorrland	342 (3)
Västmanland	150 (1)
Västra Götaland	1810 (2)
Örebro	330 (2)
Östergötland	214 (2)

On 28 April, at least eighteen Swedish people were tested for swine flu after returning from trips in Mexico and the United States, but the results were negative. On 29 April two people, recently returned from Mexico with flu like symptoms were tested.

On 6 May, the Swedish Institute for Infectious Disease Control confirmed one case of influenza A(H1N1). 186 negative test results have been reported. No suspected cases remain to be analysed.

The number of confirmed cases had reached two in Sweden, with 435 negative cases reported as of 15 May.

A third case was confirmed on Friday, 15 May, and reported on the following Saturday, where the patient, a woman in her sixties, had recovered. In all of the three cases the influenza was contracted in the United States.

A fourth case was confirmed 28 May, influenza was contracted in the United States.

On 19 July 274 cases had been confirmed. On 20 July, the number had risen to 322 confirmed cases and to 340 on 21 July. 362 cases had been reported on 22 July 390 on 23 July and 408 as of 24 July.

Three regions reported more than 20 cases; Stockholm County with 144, Skåne County with 78 and Västra Götaland County with 71.

42 of the 408 cases were contracted domestically.

A 22-year-old man in Norrköping was hospitalised with a life-threatening condition, requiring extracorporeal membrane oxygenation.

In August, a 37-year-old man in Uppsala was the first to die of H1N1 influenza in Sweden. The second case was in September, a 55-year-old man in Västerås. On 31 October, a three-year-old boy died in a hospital after first being turned down treatment even though he suffered several of the obvious symptoms.

== Switzerland ==
Outbreak evolution in Switzerland: Confirmed cases Suspected cases

The first suspicious case in Switzerland was officially confirmed on 27 April. A young man returning from holiday in Mexico informed his family doctor about fever and flu-like symptoms. He was immediately put under quarantine in a hospital. 8 more people are under observation. A container of inactive swine flu virus samples packed in dry ice exploded on a Swiss train, injuring one person but posing no other risks to humans.

Switzerland has confirmed its first case of swine flu in a 19-year-old student who returned from Mexico on 30 April. The state hospital in Baden said in a statement that the National Influenza Centre in Geneva confirmed the disease shortly after the student was mistakenly released from hospital day before.

Switzerland has confirmed its second case of swine flu in a young woman of 24. She was returning from a trip to Mexico and USA. She is now in the Hospital in Bern.

On 24 May, a third case of swine flu has been announced in a woman who came back from Washington and is resident in Basel.

As of 26 June, there are 49 confirmed cases in ten cantons, with five cases having been community-transmitted.

As of 19 November a total of three persons have been reported to die from swine flu, a baby and two women, all of them with pre-existing health problems of other origin.

== Turkey ==
Outbreak evolution in Turkey: Confirmed deaths Confirmed cases Suspected cases No reported cases

== United Kingdom and Crown Dependencies ==
Outbreak evolution in the United Kingdom Deaths Confirmed cases Suspected cases No cases

Outbreak evolution in the United Kingdom 1+ deaths 5+ deaths 20+ deaths 100+ deaths

Outbreak evolution in the United Kingdom: 500+ cases 50+ cases 5+ cases 1+ cases

UK 2009 Swine Flu cases per week. Health Protection Agency modelling

Samples from suspected cases in the United Kingdom have been analysed by the National Institute for Medical Research in London, which is also examining samples of the U.S. strain of the disease.

On 25 April 2009, a member of British Airways cabin crew was taken to Northwick Park Hospital in Harrow and quarantined after falling ill with flu-like symptoms on a flight from Mexico City though he was later found not to have swine flu.

The first cases were confirmed on 27 April in passengers returning from Mexico.

On 1 May the first UK person to person transmission was confirmed. Graeme Pacitti, 24, of Falkirk, picked up the virus after contact with the UK's first cases Iain and Dawn Askham.

It was reported on 26 May that a man who has been confirmed with swine flu was critically ill.

On 28 May, people at a Home Office building in Sheffield were quarantined, it was feared someone had caught swine flu on a recent trip to Canada. In reality, three people had caught it, the person who had been to Canada, one from someone who recently had stayed in Acapulco, Mexico, and one from someone who recently had stayed in London.

On 6 June, the total of swine flu cases hit 508 with 3 people in intensive care in hospital. On 7 June, the total of swine flu cases hit 541 with 3 people in intensive care.

As of 11 June 2009, 822 cases of swine flu were clinically confirmed.

On 13 June, the total of swine flu cases hit 1,122 with 4 people in intensive care in hospital. The following day, the first death from swine flu in the United Kingdom was reported from Scotland, making the first death from Europe.

By 9 July there were 9,718 laboratory-confirmed cases of swine flu, although the actual number of cases was likely much higher.

By 16 July, over 10000 cases of Swine flu were confirmed, with the British government suggesting a possible 55000 new cases in the week leading up to the 16. There were 29 deaths confirmed, although the majority of these had 'underlying health issues'. (26 in England and 3 in Scotland)

=== Gibraltar ===
Gibraltar has reported its first confirmed case of swine flu on 24 July.

== Timeline ==
2009	A(H1N1) outbreak and pandemic milestones in Europe
27 April	First case confirmed in Spain (First in Europe).
27 April	First case confirmed in the United Kingdom.
29 April	First case confirmed in Germany.
29 April	First case confirmed in Austria.
30 April	First case confirmed in the Netherlands.
30 April	First case confirmed in Switzerland.
30 April	First case confirmed in Ireland.
1 May	First case confirmed in Denmark.
1 May	First case confirmed in France.
2 May	First case confirmed in Italy.
3 May	First case confirmed in Portugal.
6 May	First case confirmed in Poland.
6 May	First case confirmed in Sweden.
9 May	First case confirmed in Norway.
12 May	First case confirmed in Finland.
13 May	First case confirmed in Belgium.
16 May	First case confirmed in Turkey.
18 May	First case confirmed in Greece.
22 May	First case confirmed in Russia.
23 May	First case confirmed in Iceland.
25 May	First case confirmed in the Czech Republic.
26 May	Community outbreaks confirmed in the United Kingdom.
27 May	First case confirmed in Romania.
28 May	First case confirmed in Slovakia.
29 May	First case confirmed in Hungary.
30 May	First case confirmed in Cyprus.
30 May	First case confirmed in Estonia.
31 May	Community outbreaks confirmed in Germany.
1 June	First case confirmed in Bulgaria.
2 June	First case confirmed in Luxembourg.
2 June	First case confirmed in Ukraine.
5 June	Community outbreaks confirmed in Switzerland.
12 June	First confirmed case in the Isle of Man.
14 June	First death confirmed in the United Kingdom.
17 June	First confirmed case in Monaco.
17 June	Community outbreaks confirmed in France.
18 June	First confirmed case in Jersey.
19 June	First case confirmed in Slovenia.
22 June	First case confirmed in Montenegro.
23 June	First case confirmed in Latvia.
24 June	First case confirmed in Serbia.
25 June	First human-to-animal transmission of the virus in the United Kingdom.
26 June	First case confirmed in Lithuania.
29 June	First case confirmed in Bosnia and Herzegovina.
29 June	First case of Oseltamivir (Tamiflu) resistance found in Denmark.
29 June	Community outbreaks confirmed in Italy.
30 June	First death confirmed in Spain.
1 July	First case confirmed in Malta.
4 July	First case confirmed in Croatia.
4 July	First case confirmed in Macedonia.
4 July	Community outbreaks confirmed in Spain.
7 July	Community outbreaks confirmed in Portugal.
8 July	Community outbreaks confirmed in Malta.
11 July	First case confirmed in Andorra.
19 July	First case confirmed in Georgia.
20 July	First case confirmed in Albania.
20 July	Community outbreaks confirmed in Norway.
22 July	First death confirmed in Hungary.
22 July	Community outbreaks confirmed in Ireland.
23 July	Community outbreaks confirmed in Sweden.
24 July	First case confirmed in Gibraltar.
25 July	Community outbreaks confirmed in Greece.
26 July	Community outbreaks confirmed in Cyprus.
26 July	Community outbreaks confirmed in Turkey.
27 July	Community outbreaks confirmed in Denmark.
27 July	Community outbreaks confirmed in the Netherlands.
27 July	First case confirmed in Kosovo.
30 July	First case confirmed in Azerbaijan.
30 July	First case confirmed in Moldova.
30 July	First death confirmed in Belgium.
30 July	First death confirmed in France.
3 August	First case confirmed in Akrotiri and Dhekelia.
4 August	First death confirmed in the Netherlands.
6 August	First case confirmed in Liechtenstein.
7 August	First death confirmed in Ireland.
18 August	First death confirmed in Malta.
19 August	First case confirmed in Belarus.
23 August	First death confirmed in Greece.
31 August	First death confirmed in Sweden.
3 September	First death confirmed in Norway.
4 September	First death confirmed in Italy.
17 September	First death confirmed in Luxembourg.
17 September	Community outbreaks confirmed in Belgium.
24 September	First death confirmed in Portugal.
25 September	First death confirmed in Germany.
30 September	First death confirmed in Bulgaria.
30 September	Community outbreaks confirmed in Finland.
10 October	Mass vaccinations in Sweden begins.
20 October	First death confirmed in Iceland.
21 October	First death confirmed in Serbia.
21 October	Mass vaccinations in the United Kingdom begins.
22 October	First death confirmed in the Czech Republic.
24 October	First death confirmed in Finland.
24 October	First death confirmed in Turkey.
26 October	First death confirmed in Moldova.
27 October	First death confirmed in Russia.
30 October	First death confirmed in Ukraine.
31 October	First death confirmed in Croatia.
2 November	First death confirmed in Austria.
2 November	Mass vaccinations in Turkey begins.
3 November	First death confirmed in Slovenia.
4 November	First death confirmed in Belarus.
4 November	First case of Oseltamivir (Tamiflu) resistance found in Belarus.
4 November	First case of Oseltamivir (Tamiflu) resistance found in the Netherlands.
5 November	First case confirmed in San Marino.
7 November	Mass vaccinations in Belgium begins.
9 November	First death confirmed in Latvia.
10 November	First death confirmed in Slovakia.
11 November	First case confirmed in Armenia.
12 November	Mass vaccinations in France begins.
13 November	First death confirmed in Cyprus.
13 November	First death confirmed in Poland.
14 November	First death confirmed in Kosovo.
14 November	First death confirmed in Switzerland.
16 November	First death confirmed in Bosnia and Herzegovina.
16 November	Mass vaccinations in Greece begins.
16 November	Mass vaccinations in Spain begins.
16 November	Mass vaccinations in Cyprus begins.
18 November	First death confirmed in Lithuania.
18 November	First death confirmed in Macedonia.
18 November	First case of Oseltamivir (Tamiflu) resistance found in Finland.
18 November	First case of Oseltamivir (Tamiflu) resistance found in Slovenia.
20 November	First death confirmed in Denmark.
20 November	First case of Oseltamivir (Tamiflu) resistance found in the United Kingdom.
20 November	First mutation (D222G) confirmed in Norway.
23 November	First death confirmed in Estonia.
23 November	First death confirmed in Romania.
23 November	Mass vaccinations in the Netherlands begins.
23 November	Mass vaccinations in the Czech Republic begins.
23 November	First mutation (D222G) confirmed in Ukraine.
27 November	First mutation (D222G) confirmed in France.
27 November	First case of Oseltamivir (Tamiflu) resistance found in France.
30 November	First mutation (D222G) confirmed in Finland.
30 November	First mutation (D222G) confirmed in Italy.
1 December	First death confirmed in Montenegro.
3 December	First mutation (D222G) confirmed in the Netherlands.
3 December	First death confirmed in Albania.
4 December	First mutation (D222G) confirmed in Spain.
13 December	First death confirmed in Georgia.
14 December	First death confirmed in Armenia.
15 December	First human-to-animal transmission of the virus in France.
15 December	First case of Oseltamivir (Tamiflu) resistance found in Germany.

2010	A(H1N1) outbreak and pandemic milestones in Europe
1 January	Mass vaccinations in Malta begins.
