= 2009 swine flu pandemic in Asia =

Detected human cases in Asian countries
Country	Cases	Deaths
Country	Laboratory confirmed	Confirmed (Suspected)^{‡}
ECDC totals (world)^{†}		13,763
Total	394,133	3,787
India	19,947	1035
China	120,940	659
Turkey	1,870	415
Thailand	28,939	192
South Korea	108,234	170
Iran	3,672	147
Syria	230	127
Saudi Arabia	9,355	124
Japan	11,636	107
Russia	5,613	106
Israel	4,330	81
Malaysia	7,066	77
Hong Kong	32,091	55
Vietnam	10,791	53
Iraq	2,130	42
Sri Lanka	258	36
Taiwan	5,474	35
Oman	4,837	31
Philippines	5,212	30
Yemen	2,070	28
Palestine	1,170	28
Kuwait	7,718	27
Mongolia	1,073	26
Jordan	2,794	19
Singapore	1,217	19
Georgia	120	18
Afghanistan	779	17
Pakistan	11	14
Indonesia	1,097	10
North Korea	50	10
Qatar	550	8
Bahrain	13,036	7
Bangladesh	800	6
United Arab Emirates	125	6
Cambodia	313	6
Lebanon	1,500	5
Armenia	25	3
Nepal	145	2
Azerbaijan	14	2
Brunei	971	1
Cyprus	297	1
Laos	242	1
Maldives	6	1
Myanmar	65	0
Kyrgyzstan	63	0
Kazakhstan	17	0
Bhutan	6	0
Timor-Leste	6	0
Tajikistan	16	0
51 countries in Asia with confirmed cases.

The 2009 flu pandemic in Asia, part of an epidemic in 2009 of a new strain of influenza A virus subtype H1N1 causing what has been commonly called swine flu, afflicted at least 394,133 people in Asia with 2,137 confirmed deaths: there were 1,035 deaths confirmed in India, 737 deaths in China, 415 deaths in Turkey, 192 deaths in Thailand, and 170 deaths in South Korea. Among the Asian countries, South Korea had the most confirmed cases, followed by mainland China, Hong Kong, and Thailand.

Cases of the A(H1N1) virus in Asia:
Deaths
Confirmed cases
Suspected cases
No reported cases

Number of confirmed deaths of A(H1N1) virus in Asia:
No deaths
1+ deaths
5+ deaths
10+ deaths
50+ deaths
100+ deaths
500+ deaths
1000+ deaths
5000+ deaths

Number of confirmed cases of A(H1N1) virus in Asia:
50 000+ cases
5 000+ cases
500+ cases
50+ cases
5+ cases
1+ cases

Community Outbreaks in Asia:
Community Outbreaks

== Azerbaijan ==
On 27 April 2009 Azerbaijan imposed a ban on import of animal husbandry products from the Americas.

On 30 July, the first cases of influenza A (H1N1) were confirmed.

== Bahrain ==
In July, the Ministry of Health launched an awareness campaign ahead of the start of the academic year, with many fearing the reopening of schools would lead to a much greater outbreak of the flu. By early August, 18 confirmed cases of the flu were reported. Haj travel agencies reported that thousands of Bahraini pilgrims cancelled their trips to Mecca over fears of contracting swine flu. Over 180 confirmed cases of the flu were reported in late August, all of whom had returned from traveling abroad.

On 31 August, a 30-year-old Filipino housemaid died after contracting the H1N1 virus, becoming Bahrain's first confirmed death as a result of the virus. On 3 September, it was reported that a 24-year-old Bahraini man died after succumbing to the H1N1 virus, being the first Bahraini to die of the disease. On 8 September, it was announced that patients with flu-like symptoms would be treated with Tamiflu nationwide, regardless of having a fever or not. It was also announced that a million doses of the swine flu vaccine were ordered. The Bahraini Ministry of Education had decided to postpone the opening of schools until October as a precaution, a decision that drew criticism from the World Health Organization. In November 2009, the government stated that up to 1,346 cases of the H1N1 virus were confirmed in the country, along with 15,000 suspected cases of the virus.

== Bangladesh ==
As of 22 August 98 cases of the A (H1N1) virus were confirmed in Bangladesh.

== Burma (Myanmar) ==
On 1 May 2009 Chairman of Global Human Flu Prevention and Response Work Committee Deputy Minister for Health Dr Mya Oo inspected preventive measures against the human flu at Yangon International Airport, Burma (also known as Myanmar). On 27 June, Burmese state-run Radio Myanmar confirmed the first case of influenza A/H1N1 – a 13-year-old girl who just returned from a trip to Singapore.

== China ==
Outbreak evolution in mainland China: Confirmed Cases Confirmed Deaths

The first suspected case found on mainland China was reported on 11 May 2009. As of 29 July 2009, the number of confirmed A/H1N1 cases in mainland China topped 2,000, with no deaths or serious cases reported, according to the Ministry of Health (MOH). Of the total 2,003 confirmed cases, 1,853 had recovered, said a statement on the MOH website.

The General Administration of Quality Supervision, Inspection and Quarantine (AQSIQ) of China issued an emergency notice on the evening of 26 April that visitors returning from flu-affected areas who experienced flu-like symptoms within two weeks would be quarantined.

In early September 2009, China's State Food and Drug Administration granted approval to a homegrown swine flu vaccine, which producer Sinovac Biotech claimed to be effective after only one dose.

On 4 January 2010, the Chinese Health Ministry announced that 659 deaths from swine flu have been recorded in 2009, with 120,940 confirmed detected cases throughout the year.

== Cyprus ==
Cyprus identified its first case of H1N1 on 30 May in a 39-year-old woman from Moldova, living in Cyprus, who returned from the United States on 28 May. As of 11 July 250 cases were confirmed in Cyprus.

== Hong Kong ==
Outbreak evolution in Hong Kong: Confirmed cases Deaths

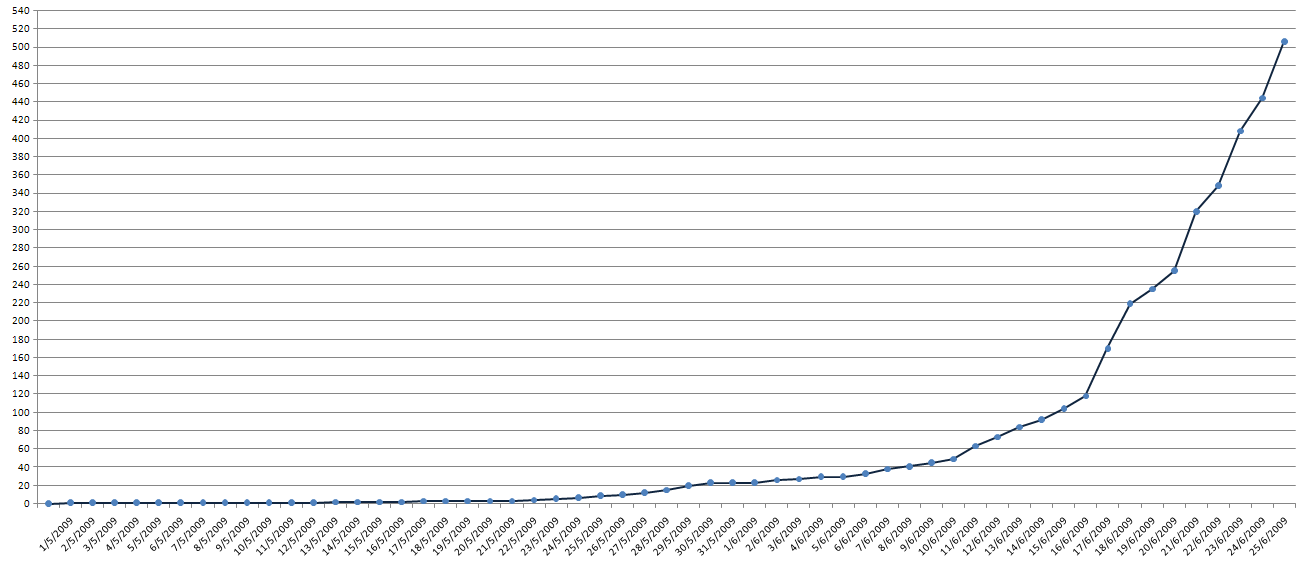
Cumulative confirmed cases per day

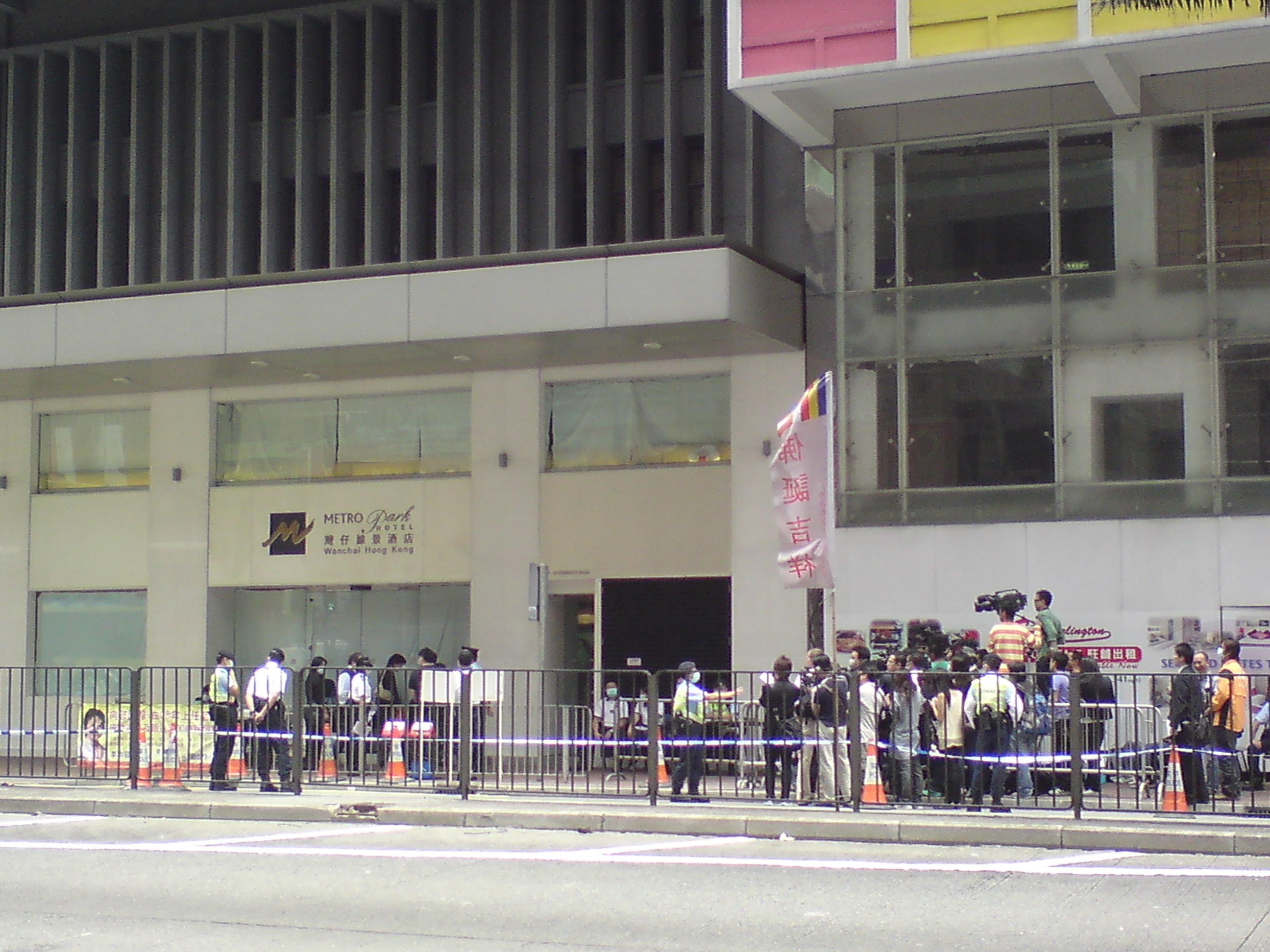
Metropark Hotel Wanchai under swine flu quarantine due to first case

The Food and Health Bureau of Hong Kong issued travel advice for Mexico on 26 April 2009, which advised Hong Kong residents not to travel to Mexico unless absolutely necessary. The first case reported was a Mexican who flew in from Shanghai. The Bureau also escalated the alert level from "alert" to "serious" on the same day, which activated health protection measures in all ports of entry of Hong Kong. As such, temperature screening machines were used at all checkpoints to identify passengers with fever and respiratory symptoms. Any passenger who failed the temperature test and was confirmed as having a fever was quarantined and sent to public hospital for further investigation. Hong Kong also became one of the first jurisdictions to declare swine flu as a notifiable disease, and much of the procedures against the spread of the swine flu were learned from the 2003 SARS outbreak, of which Hong Kong was the epicenter of the outbreak.

The Secretary for Food and Health York Chow stated that special attention will be paid to passengers who came from countries where human infection of swine influenza cases were reported.

On 1 May, one case became the first confirmed case of swine flu in Hong Kong and also the first in Asia after being tested positive by the University of Hong Kong and the Department of Health of Hong Kong. The Mexican patient, who travelled with two companions from Mexico to Hong Kong with a stopover in Shanghai Pudong Airport, arrived in Hong Kong on 30 April. Metropark Hotel Wanchai, where the patient stayed, was cordoned off by the police and health officials from the Centre for Health Protection. All 350 guests and hotel staff had to remain inside the hotel for seven days. After the first swine flu case was confirmed by laboratory, Chief Executive Sir Donald Tsang raised Hong Kong's response level from "serious" to "emergency".

As of 27 August 2009, there have been 10,468 confirmed cases of swine flu in the city.

== India ==
H1N1 in India Confirmed cases Deaths No cases

The Government of India decided to screen all people entering India via the main airport hubs of Mumbai, New Delhi, Goa, Jaipur, Kochi, Kolkata, Chennai, Bangalore and Hyderabad, with the primary focus being passengers entering from the United States of America, United Kingdom, Canada, Mexico, France, and New Zealand. All in all, 50,000 people were affected by the virus, with 2,700 confirmed deaths.

== Indonesia ==
Outbreak evolution in Indonesia: Confirmed cases Deaths

After a coordination meeting about the flu on 27 April 2009, the Indonesian government halted the importation of pigs and initiated the examination of 9 million pigs in Indonesia. Thermal scanners, which can detect human body temperature, were installed at Indonesian ports of entry. Temperatures above 38 degrees Celsius (100.4 Fahrenheit) cause the devices to beep, indicating fever.

As of 18 August 2009, one death was reported.

== Israel and the West Bank ==
Outbreak evolution in Israel and the West Bank: Confirmed cases Unconfirmed or suspected cases

Over 4000 cases were confirmed in Israel, and over 60 people died. In response to the outbreak, the Israeli Deputy Minister of Health, Yaakov Litzman, said that because swine are unclean, the outbreak needed to be renamed; and so in Israel, out of respect for the religious sensibilities of Muslims, it was called "Mexican Flu". This was done so as to not confuse the population into thinking that they could not acquire the virus if they did not eat pork. The Israeli government retracted this proposal following Mexican complaints.

== Japan ==
H1N1 in Japan Confirmed cases Deaths

The Ministry of Agriculture, Forestry and Fisheries of Japan instructed animal quarantine offices across Japan to examine any live pigs being brought into Japan to make sure they were not infected with the influenza. Japanese Agriculture Minister Shigeru Ishiba appeared on television to reassure customers that it was safe to eat pork. The Japanese farm ministry said that it would not ask for restrictions on pork imports because the virus was unlikely to turn up in pork, and would be killed by cooking.

On 8 May, the first three cases were confirmed. The infected patients had spent time in Oakville, Canada and returned to Japan via Detroit. On 10 May, another case was confirmed from a student who came from a school trip to Canada, making it the fourth case in Japan.

There have been 944 case confirmed in Japan as of 24 June 2009.

On 2 July, the first case of oseltamivir-resistant virus in Asia was announced in Japan, in a woman who had been taking Tamiflu prophylactically.

== Kazakhstan ==
The first cases of A (H1N1) virus were discovered in 3 students from the capital Astana according to Natalia Buenko, an advisor to the Ministry of Health of Kazakhstan.

== Laos ==
Outbreak evolution in Laos Deaths Confirmed cases No cases

The Lao government agreed to buy 10 thermal imaging machines and install them at the country's major immigration border checkpoints. The machines would help officials identify anyone entering the country with a high temperature and create confidence among Laotians, foreigners living in Laos and people traveling to Laos. Health officials would be on hand at international border checkpoints to ensure anyone found to be infected could be treated immediately. Each machine could cost about US$25,000. The decision to buy them was made after the government found visitors to Laos included people coming from the United States, Spain and other affected countries.

The Prime Minister Bouasone Bouphavanh said masks should be made available and health officials would be assigned to work at border checkpoints. Health officials would be on hand at international border checkpoints to ensure anyone found to be infected could be treated immediately. On 18 June, the first case in Laos was confirmed.

== Lebanon ==
A Lebanese man suffering from a serious illness died from the H1N1 swine flu strain on Thursday 30 July 2009, which makes the first death in Lebanon, Health Minister Mohammad Khalifeh told Reuters. The 30-year-old victim had been receiving treatment for leukemia when he contracted the virus, possibly from relatives who had just traveled from Australia to Lebanon, the minister said. Lebanon has recorded more than 100 cases of H1N1.

== Malaysia ==
Outbreak evolution in Malaysia Deaths Confirmed cases

Malaysia detected the first case of influenza A(H1N1) on 15 May 2009 in a 21-year-old student who returned from the United States. As of 11 August 2009 there were 2,253 confirmed cases in Malaysia. The Health Ministry announced that from 12 August 2009 they had discontinued the counting of the total number of H1N1 cases in line with guidelines issued by the World Health Organization.

== Maldives ==
The first death from H1N1 flu virus was confirmed on 19 November.

== Mongolia ==
H1N1 in Mongolia Deaths Confirmed cases No cases

The Mongolian Health Ministry sought to prevent the spread of swine flu in Mongolia by urging people to avoid public places.

As of 22 October 126 cases were confirmed in Mongolia. Just after seven days, the number increased to 394 with five deaths.

== North Korea ==
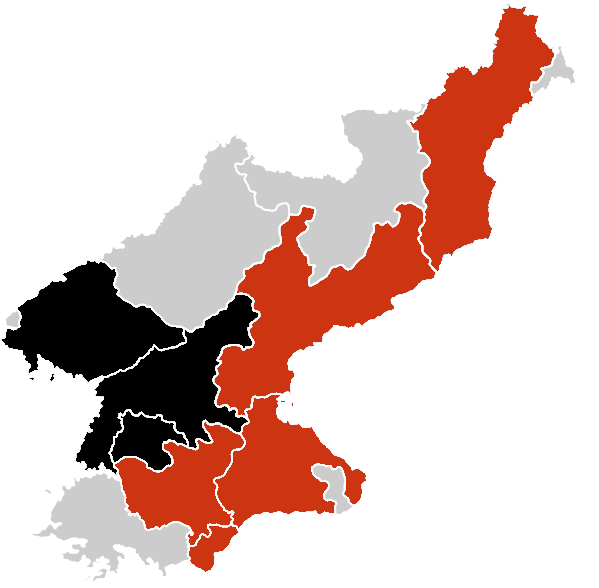
H1N1 disease in North Korea Deaths Confirmed cases No cases

Most defectors with backgrounds in health care agree that, considering the isolation of North Korean society and its highly inadequate health care system, incidents of swine flu are likely to be either suppressed or merely misdiagnosed.

Following the confirmation of the first case of the disease in Mongolia, heightened concerns arose.

On 16 November, the first known case was confirmed by the Ministry of Unification, released in a report by Korea Times. The first case was confirmed in a South Korean worker in Gaeseong Industrial Complex.

== Oman ==
As of 13 August 2009, 337 cases have been confirmed by the National Pandemic Influenza Committee in Oman.

== Pakistan ==
There were 90 confirmed cases as of 26 January 2010.

== Philippines ==
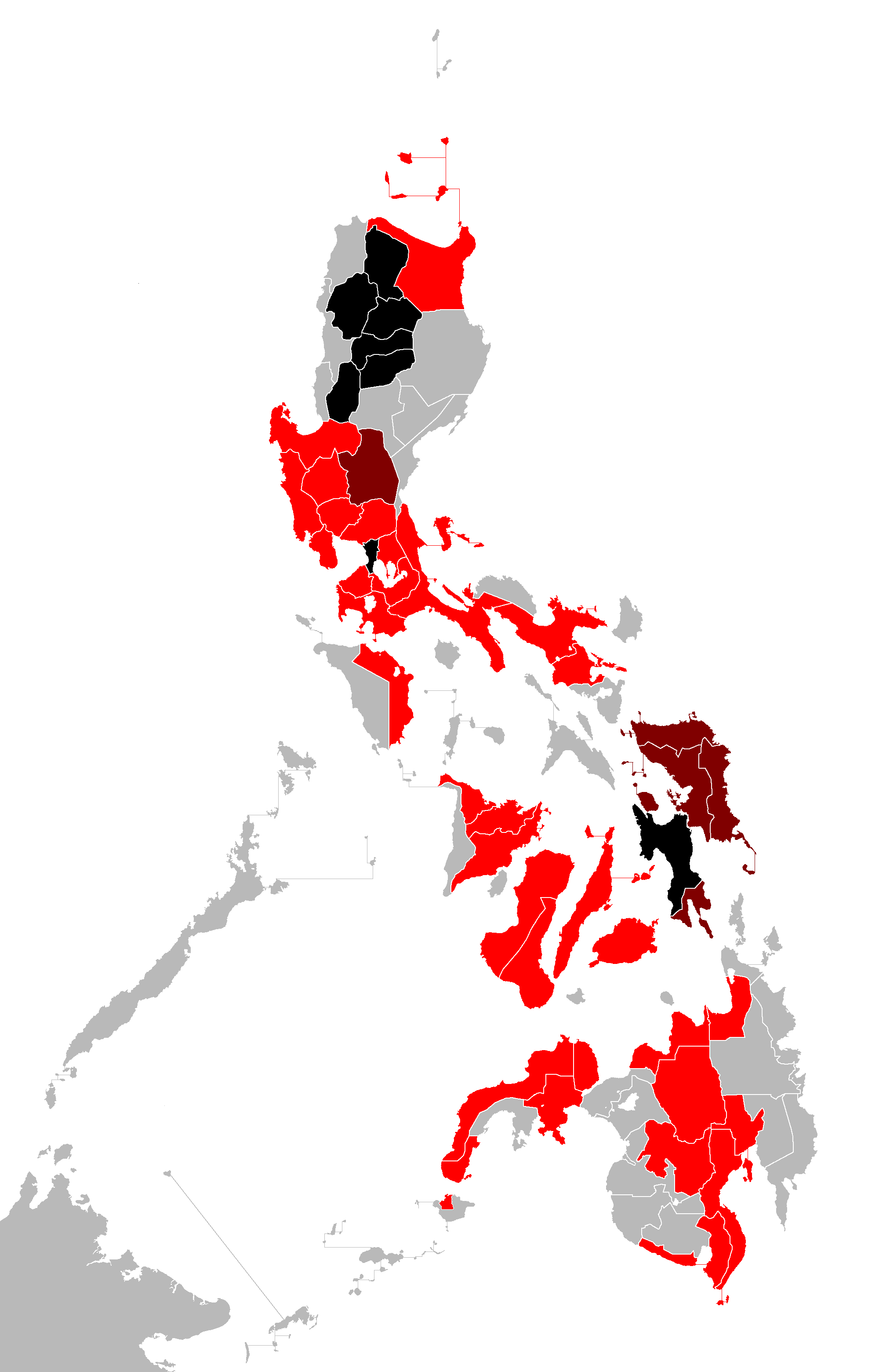
Deaths Confirmed community outbreak Confirmed cases Suspected cases

Health Secretary Francisco T. Duque III ordered the Bureau of Quarantine to use thermal imaging equipment at airports to screen passengers coming from the US for flu symptoms. The Philippines may quarantine travelers arriving from Mexico with fevers. Also, the Secretary of the Department of Agriculture issued an order banning the importation of hogs from the U.S. and Mexico, and the retraction of the restriction of swine influenza vaccine use. The medical alert phase is already Code White, the lowest.

On 18 May 2009, a Filipina girl who arrived from Houston, Texas, United States was the first confirmed case of H1N1 virus in the Philippines.

The highest confirmed in one day was on 24 June 2009 with 131 cases. The next day, the confirmed cases added was 123. Because of that, the Department of Health ordered the people that should get swab tests are the only people with very complicated cases (e.g. with lung disorders, hearth disorders, babies etc.). The government said that the very fast spreading of the disease was caused by the population density of the country.

== Saudi Arabia ==
By 17 August, there have been about 2,000 cases of the flu, resulting in 14 deaths.

== Singapore ==
On 30 April 2009, the Singapore Ministry of Health raised its Disease Outbreak Response System to "Alert Orange". The first case of the H1N1 virus in Singapore was confirmed on 27 May 2009, in which a then 22-year-old woman picked up the virus after visiting New York City, United States. As of 7 July 2009, there were 1,217 confirmed cases. As of 17 October 2009, there were 18 confirmed deaths from the H1N1 virus in Singapore. On 12 February 2010, the Singapore Ministry of Health moved its alert level to Green.

== Sri Lanka ==
The first case of Influenza A (H1N1-2009) was confirmed on 16 June 2009 in Sri Lanka.

== South Korea ==
On 28 April, South Korea reported its first probable case of swine flu after positive preliminary tests on a nun who had recently returned from a trip to Mexico. South Korea became the third infected nation in Asia, after Israel and Hong Kong. On 15 August, the first Korean death by the new influenza was confirmed and a second death was announced on 16 August. Around late November 2009, there was a double cases from the US. Around 15000 cases and 14 deaths have been reported as of 12 October 2009.

== Taiwan ==
Outbreak evolution in Taiwan: Confirmed cases Deaths

On 20 May 2009, the first case of the influenza was confirmed in Taiwan.

There were 5,474 confirmed cases of H1N1 in Taiwan.

== Thailand ==
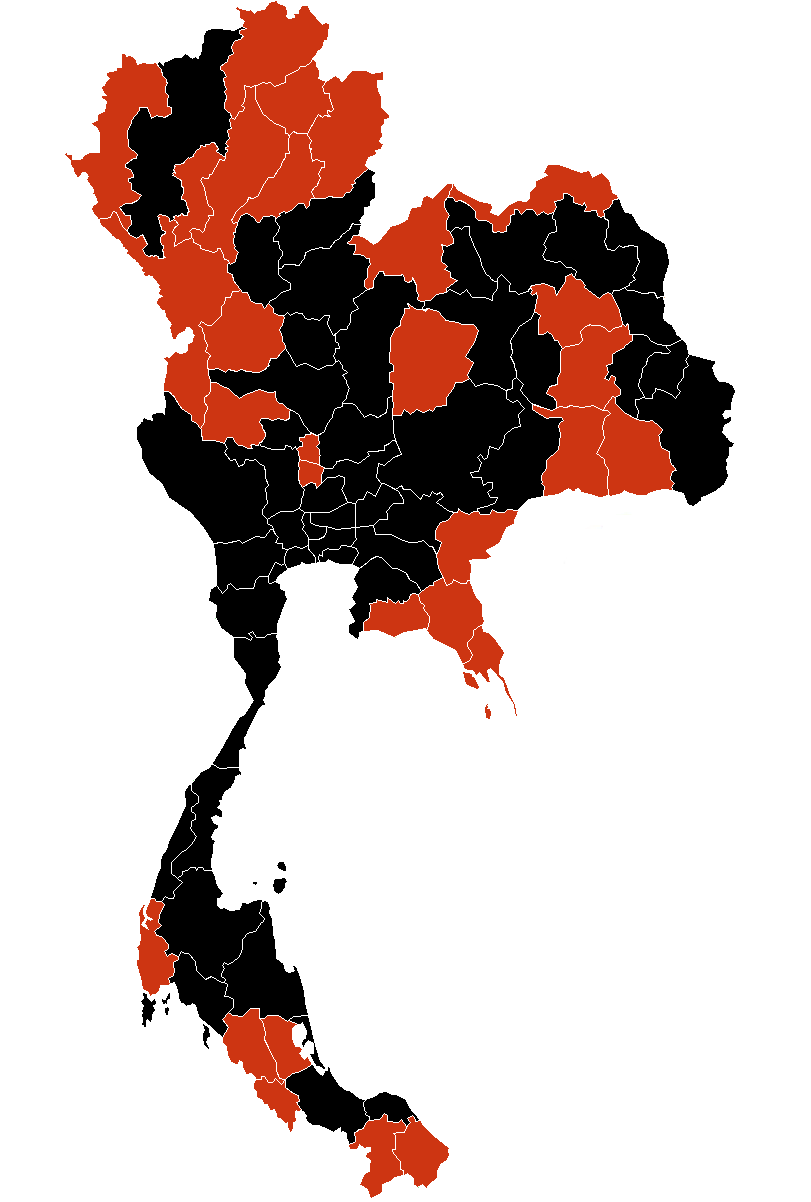
Outbreak evolution in Thailand Deaths Confirmed cases Suspected cases

== Turkey ==
Outbreak evolution Turkey Deaths Confirmed cases Suspect cases

The first case of A(H1N1) in Turkey was reported on 16 May 2009. A U.S. citizen, flying from the United States via Amsterdam was found to be suffering from the swine flu after arriving Istanbul's Atatürk International Airport. Turkey is the 36th country in the world to report an incident of swine flu. The Turkish Government has taken measures at the international airports, using thermal imaging cameras to check passengers coming from international destinations. As of 11 August, there were 312 confirmed cases in Turkey. As of 24 October, there is 1 confirmed death in Turkey. It is reported by Ministry of Health that one person died in Ankara. In addition, there are 958 confirmed cases in Turkey.

== Vietnam ==
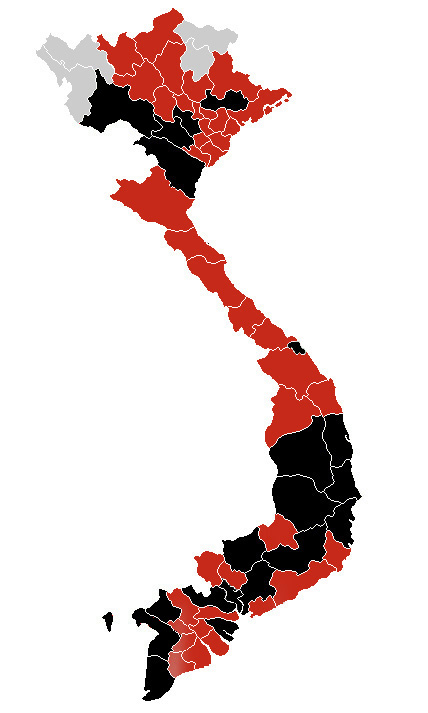
Outbreak evolution in Vietnam Deaths Confirmed cases

On 31 May 2009, The government of Vietnam announced its first case of A (H1N1) virus in the country.

== Yemen ==
As of 4 July 2009 there have been reported 7 cases of A(H1N1) flu in Yemen.

== Timeline ==
2009	A(H1N1) Outbreak and Pandemic Milestones in Asia
28 April	First case confirmed in Israel.
1 May	First case confirmed in Hong Kong.
2 May	First case confirmed in South Korea.
8 May	First case confirmed in Japan.
10 May	First case confirmed in China.
12 May	First case confirmed in Thailand.
15 May	First case confirmed in Malaysia.
16 May	First case confirmed in India.
16 May	First case confirmed in Turkey.
17 May	Community outbreaks confirmed in Japan.
19 May	First case confirmed in Taiwan.
21 May	First case confirmed in the Philippines.
22 May	First case confirmed in Russia.
24 May	First case confirmed in Kuwait.
24 May	First case confirmed in the United Arab Emirates.
25 May	First case confirmed in Bahrain.
27 May	First case confirmed in Singapore.
30 May	First case confirmed in Cyprus.
30 May	First case confirmed in Lebanon.
31 May	First case confirmed in Vietnam.
3 June	First case confirmed in Saudi Arabia.
11 June	(Palestine) First case confirmed in the Palestinian Territories.
11 June	Community outbreaks confirmed in Hong Kong.
14 June	Community outbreaks confirmed in Philippines.
16 June	First confirmed case in Jordan.
16 June	First confirmed case in Qatar.
16 June	First confirmed case in Sri Lanka.
16 June	Community outbreaks confirmed in Thailand.
16 June	First confirmed case in Yemen.
17 June	First case confirmed in Oman.
17 June	Community outbreaks confirmed in Malaysia.
18 June	First case confirmed in Macau, China.
18 June	First case confirmed in Laos.
19 June	First case confirmed in Bangladesh.
22 June	First death confirmed in the Philippines.
22 June	First case confirmed in Iran.
23 June	(Macau) Community outbreaks confirmed in Macao.
24 June	First case confirmed in Indonesia.
24 June	First case confirmed in Cambodia.
24 June	First case confirmed in Iraq.
26 June	Community outbreaks confirmed in China.
27 June	First death confirmed in Thailand.
27 June	First case confirmed in Myanmar.
29 June	First case confirmed in Nepal.
29 June	Community outbreaks confirmed in Singapore.
1 July	Community outbreaks confirmed in South Korea.
2 July	First death confirmed in Brunei.
2 July	First case of Oseltamivir (Tamiflu) resistance found in Japan.
3 July	First case of Oseltamivir (Tamiflu) resistance found in Hong Kong.
4 July	First case confirmed in Syria.
8 July	First case confirmed in Afghanistan.
10 July	First death confirmed in Hong Kong.
13 July	Community outbreaks confirmed in Saudi Arabia.
16 July	First death confirmed in Singapore.
19 July	(Georgia (country)) First case confirmed in Georgia.
19 July	Community outbreaks confirmed in Israel.
21 July	Community outbreaks confirmed in Indonesia.
22 July	Community outbreaks confirmed in India.
22 July	Community outbreaks confirmed in Vietnam.
22 July	First death confirmed in Laos.
23 July	First death confirmed in Malaysia.
23 July	First case confirmed in Bhutan.
23 July	First case confirmed in Kazakhstan.
24 July	First case confirmed in Maldives.
25 July	Community outbreaks confirmed in Brunei.
25 July	Community outbreaks confirmed in Taiwan.
26 July	Community outbreaks confirmed in Cyprus.
26 July	Community outbreaks confirmed in Turkey.
26 July	First death confirmed in Indonesia.
27 July	First death confirmed in Israel.
27 July	First death confirmed in Saudi Arabia.
27 July	Community outbreaks confirmed in United Arab Emirates.
30 July	First case confirmed in Azerbaijan.
30 July	First death confirmed in Taiwan.
30 July	First death confirmed in Lebanon.
31 July	First death confirmed in Qatar.
2 August	First death confirmed in India.
3 August	First case confirmed in Pakistan.
4 August	First death confirmed in Vietnam.
5 August	First death confirmed in Iran.
7 August	First death confirmed in Palestine.
8 August	First case of Oseltamivir (Tamiflu) resistance found in Thailand.
9 August	First death confirmed in Iraq.
12 August	(Timor-Leste) First case confirmed in East Timor.
14 August	First case of Oseltamivir (Tamiflu) resistance found in Singapore.
14 August	First case of Oseltamivir (Tamiflu) resistance found in China.
15 August	First death confirmed in South Korea.
15 August	First death confirmed in Japan.
18 August	First death confirmed in Yemen.
20 August	First death confirmed in Kuwait.
20 August	First death confirmed in United Arab Emirates.
21 August	First death confirmed in Oman.
24 August	First case confirmed in Kyrgyzstan.
26 August	First death confirmed in Syria.
29 August	First death confirmed in Bangladesh.
31 August	First death confirmed in Bahrain.
2 September	First death confirmed in Macau.
10 September	First case of Oseltamivir (Tamiflu) resistance found in Israel.
21 September	Mass vaccinations in China, which is the first one in the world, begins.
28 September	First death confirmed in Cambodia.
30 September	(China) First completed clinical trials by a company for 2009/H1N1 vaccine in the world.
4 October	First case confirmed in Tajikistan.
6 October	First death confirmed in China.
12 October	First case of Oseltamivir (Tamiflu) resistance found in Vietnam.
12 October	First death confirmed in Jordan.
13 October	First case confirmed in Mongolia.
19 October	Mass vaccinations in Japan begins.
23 October	First death confirmed in Mongolia.
24 October	First death confirmed in Turkey.
26 October	Mass vaccinations in Oman begins
27 October	First death confirmed in Russia.
27 October	Mass vaccinations in South Korea begins.
29 October	First death confirmed in Afghanistan.
1 November	Mass vaccinations in Kuwait begins
3 November	Mass vaccinations in Singapore begins.
3 November	Mass vaccinations in Qatar begins
7 November	First death confirmed in Pakistan.
7 November	First death confirmed in Sri Lanka.
7 November	Mass vaccinations in Saudi Arabia begins
7 November	Mass Vaccinations in Bahrain begins
8 November	First case confirmed in Armenia.
13 November	First death confirmed in Cyprus.
16 November	First case confirmed in North Korea.
18 November	First death confirmed in Maldives.
20 November	Mass vaccinations in Jordan begins
7 December	First death confirmed in North Korea.
13 December	First death confirmed in Armenia.
14 December	(Georgia (country)) First death confirmed in Georgia.
27 December	First death confirmed in Nepal.

== Top 5 countries ==
Top 5 cases	Top 5 deaths
China	India
Hong Kong	Thailand
Thailand	Turkey
India	South Korea
South Korea	China
