= 2009 swine flu pandemic in Spain =

- Deaths Confirmed cases
- Disease: Swine flu
- Pathogen: H1N1
- Index case: Almansa
- Arrival date: 27 April 2009
- Confirmed cases: 1194
- Deaths: 17

In March and April 2009, an outbreak of a new strain of influenza commonly referred to as swine flu infected many people in Mexico and parts of the United States causing severe illness in the former. The new strain was identified as a combination of several different strains of Influenzavirus A, subtype H1N1, including separate strains of this subtype circulating in humans (see Human influenza) and in pigs (see Swine influenza). Spain was the first country in continental Europe to report cases of swine flu, in late April 2009.

In this video, Joe Bresee, with CDC's Influenza Division, describes the symptoms of swine flu and warning signs to look for that indicate the need for urgent medical attention.

== First cases in Europe ==
On 27 April, Spain confirmed the first case of Swine influenza in Europe. The patient was a 23-year-old man that had returned from Mexico on the 22nd and was in hospital with flu-like symptoms. The case was confirmed in Almansa, in the province of Albacete.

On 28 April, a second case was confirmed in Valencia. The patient had traveled to Mexico with the first confirmed patient. Other cases in Valencia and the Basque Country were reported soon afterwards.

By 30 April, there were 13 confirmed and 80 unconfirmed cases throughout Spain.

By 5 May, there were 73 confirmed cases, of which only nine had not travelled to Mexico in the previous four months.

By 29 April 2010, Spain had confirmed 1,536 cases and 300 deaths, as well as reporting 155,051 unconfirmed cases.

== Response ==
The Health and Social Policy minister, Trinidad Jiménez, announced that all passengers coming from Mexico, United States, Canada, New Zealand, Colombia, France and Israel have to fill a form during their flight.

There was a reinforcement of medical teams in all airports to handle possible swine flu cases.

The Ministry of Foreign Affairs recommended cancelling any travel to Mexico unless strictly necessary. It also recommended reevaluating the need to travel to the United States.

== Affected areas ==
Cases of H1N1 swine flu by autonomous community
Autonomous Community	Laboratory confirmed cases	Other possible cases*	Deaths from possible cases*
Community of Madrid	749	0	2
Canary Islands	31	0	3
Balearic Islands	9	0	1
Andalucia	44	0	2
Valencian Community	29	15	3
Catalonia	26	5	1
Castilla-La Mancha	5	0	1
Region of Murcia	1	0	0
Basque Country	1	0	0
Galicia	1	0	0
Aragon	1	0	0
Extremadura	1	0	0
Castilla y León	7	0	0
Asturias	1	0	0
La Rioja	0	0	0
Navarra	4	0	0
Ceuta	0	0	0
Melilla	0	0	0
Cantabria	1	0	0
Total	690	+25,000	13
(*) Not all cases have been confirmed as due to this strain. Possible cases are cases of influenza-like illness (ILI) that have not been confirmed through testing to be due to this strain.

=== Confirmed cases ===
- There are 969 confirmed cases, with the latest all taken by awaiting samples. The Spanish government has affirmed the situation is under constant monitoring and control, recommending the population not to panic.
- Madrid has the greatest number of confirmed cases.
- The North African Spanish cities of Ceuta and Melilla and also La Rioja have not reported any confirmed cases of swine flu.

=== Deaths ===
A 19-year-old woman in Spain became the first patient in continental Europe who died because of swine flu. A second death was confirmed on 9 July in the Canary Islands, it was a 41-year-old man with a chronic disease. The second affected land in Europe has reported seven death cases up to 29 July.

=== Madrid outbreak ===
In early June, Madrid had an outbreak of swine flu among school children. By 9 June over 100 school children in Madrid had been confirmed to have swine flu.

== Confirmed cases by autonomous community ==
=== Andalusia ===
On 21 August 2009 the first death occurred in Andalusia when a 39-year-old woman, 39 weeks pregnant, died six days after being admitted to the Hospital Valme in Sevilla. On the same day, a 50-year-old woman died in the Hospital de La Línea (Cádiz) after being admitted on 3 August.

On 23 August, a morbidly obese 20-year-old woman died after being admitted to the Hospotal San Cecilio de Granada on 19 August. This was the third fatality due to H1N1 that weekend.

=== Community of Madrid ===
On 22 May 2009, the Ministry of Defence quarantined the Military Engineering Academy in Hoyo de Manzanares, where there were six confirmed and a further five suspected cases.

On 1 June 2009, the Community of Madrid Health Office (represented by Juan José Güemes) confirmed two cases at the Isaac Albéniz secondary school and announced that this number could increase considerably in the future. The school head reported 25 cases, but these have not been confirmed.

On 9 June 2009, the Community of Madrid Health Office confirmed 121 cases in 17 schools. On 11 June 2009, there were 139 cases confirmed in 22 schools.

On 29 June 2009 a 20-year-old woman died after giving birth, becoming the first to die of H1N1 infection in Spain.

On 16 July, the fourth death in Spain and second in the Community of Madrid occurred. A 71-year-old man with chronic obstructive pulmonary disease died in the Hospital Universitario La Paz, Madrid.

On 24 August 2009, a man died in a Madrid hospital (although his identity was not revealed on his family's request). This was the sixteenth death due to the H1N1 virus in Spain.

=== Canary Islands ===
On 9 July 2009 the second death occurred in the Canary Islands. A 41-year-old man died in the ICU of the Hospital Universitario de Gran Canaria Doctor Negrín in Las Palmas. His rapid deterioration was due to a previous condition.

On 12 August, the tenth death due to H1N1 occurred in Spain with the death of a 30-year-old man, admitted to the Hospital Insular de Gran Canaria on 20 July, who also showed additional risk factors.

On 17 August, an 11-year-old boy died of a chronic illness which was aggravated by the H1N1 infection.

=== Balearic Islands ===
On 16 July 2009, the third death occurred in the Hospital Son Llàtzer, Palma, Majorca. The deceased was a 33-year-old Nigerian woman with no previous health issues.

=== Valencian community ===
On 20 July 2009 in Teulada, Spain a man who had been on dialysis since 1993 died. This was the fifth death at the national level.

On 27 July 2009 the sixth person died: a 53-year-old man, in the Hospital La Ribera in Alzira, Valencia. He had a serious prior pathology.

On 10 August the ninth person died: a 28-year-old woman admitted to the Hospital 9 de Octubre in Valencia.

On 14 August the eleventh person died, a 31-year-old pregnant woman in an irreversible coma in the Hospital General, Castellón de la Plana.

=== Castilla-La Mancha ===
On 29 July 2009, a 34-year-old man died (the seventh in Spain) in Villarrobledo, Albacete. He had been admitted on 12 July with a serious illness.

=== Catalonia ===
On 4 August 2009 the first death in Catalonia and eighth in the country occurred. The patient, a 35-year-old woman, died in Girona after being admitted to hospital two days before.

=== Galicia ===
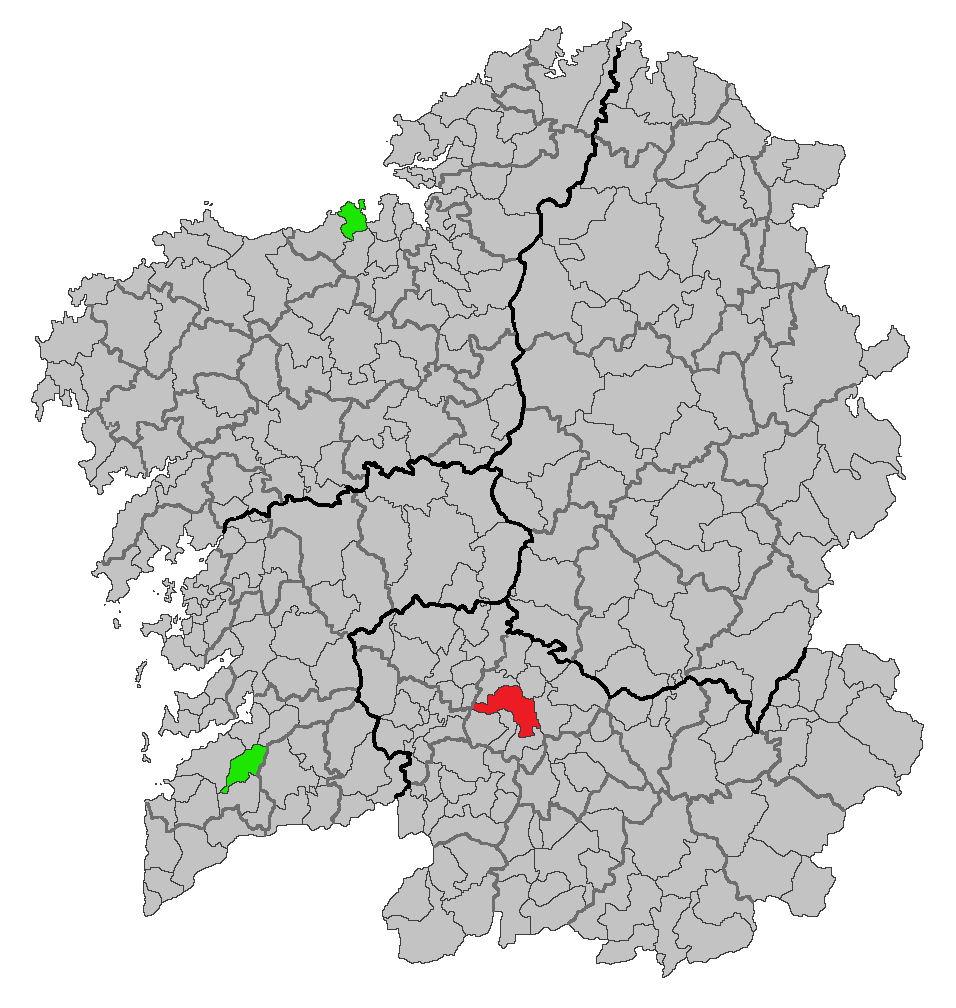
Deaths Confirmed cases Suspected cases Formerly suspected cases

The first case of H1N1 in Galicia was recorded on 29 April 2009 in the province of Ourense, although it was not confirmed until several days later. The deceased was a woman who had recently travelled to Mexico.

Patients with similar symptoms to those of H1N1 had been recorded previously and were considered as possible cases at the time. The first was detected in Mos on 27 April 2009 in a middle-aged male patient who had arrived from Mexico several days beforehand. The first flu case in Spain was confirmed on the same day in Almansa, but was unrelated. On 1 May 2009 another new suspected case appeared in A Coruña, also in a Mexican person. Several days later these cases were confirmed to be unrelated to H1N1.

On 27 August 2009 a 33-year-old male died in Vigo due to complications from flu, although he had other serious conditions.

== See also ==
- 2009 swine flu pandemic
- Avian influenza
- Spanish flu
- 2009 flu pandemic in France
- 2009 swine flu pandemic in the United States
- 2009 swine flu pandemic in Canada
- 2009 swine flu pandemic in Mexico
