= Toni Tecuceanu =

Romanian actor

Toni
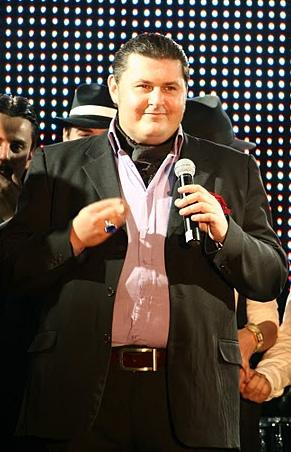
- Toni Tecuceanu at Party Kiss in 2009.
- Born: Aurelian Antonio Tecuceanu; 13 January 1972; Bucharest, Romania
- Died: 5 January 2010 (aged 37); Bucharest, Romania
- Occupations: Actor, comedian, television
- Years active: 2000s – December 2009

Aurelian-Antonio Tecuceanu (Romanian pronunciation: [ˌa.ureliˈan anˈtoni.o tekuˈt͡ʃe̯anu]; 13 January 1972 – 5 January 2010), also known as Toni (Romanian pronunciation: [ˈtoni]), was a Romanian comedy actor. He was a member of Cronica Cârcotaşilor, a popular sitcom at Prima TV.

On 5 January 2010 he died at Matei Balş Hospital in Bucharest, due to complications from swine flu, at age 37. His death created a panic in Romania and after his death the rate of vaccinations increased. He was buried at Ghencea Cemetery.

== Career ==
Tecuceanu played well-known characters such as Adrian Năstase, Corneliu Vadim Tudor, Cristian Ţânţăreanu or Gigi Becali. He took part in peace-keeping missions under the command of United Nations. He also performed on the theatre scene, and played in movies and TV broadcastings. In 2006, at Gala Tânărului Actor, Tecuceanu was awarded the best actor prize for Lomeier in the spectacle Noapte arabă, directed by Theodorei Herghelegiu, performance at Teatrul Foarte Mic from Bucharest.

== Film ==
- 2009 – Amintiri din Epoca de Aur

== See also ==
- Cronica Cârcotaşilor
- 2009 flu pandemic in Romania
