= Réseau Sentinelles =

Volunteer clinical org

The Réseau Sentinelles or the French GPs' Sentinelles Network is a network of 1 314 volunteer general practitioners and 116 pediatricians, working throughout the metropolitan regions of France (respectively 2.1% and 4.3% of the total general practitioners and pediatricians in these regions). Its goal is to provide clinical surveillance in France for 10 health indicators. This network, created in November 1984 by Professor Alain-Jacques Valleron, is regulated under the auspices of the mixed research unit U1136 of Inserm and Sorbonne University.

== Continuous surveillance of 10 health indicators ==
This national system of clinical surveillance collects real-time epidemiological data, originating from the participating general practitioners, to be used in analysis, forecasting and redistribution. It is also a part of the surveillance warning system directed by French national agency of public health (Santé publique France) (receiving the CNIL's favorable recommendation n°471 393).

The 10 health indicators surveyed are 9 infectious diseases:

- Influenza-like illness (ILI) since 1984,
- Male urethritis since 1984
- Mumps since 1985,
- Acute diarrhea (gastroenteritis) since 1990,
- Varicella zoster since 1990,
- Herpes zoster since 2004,
- Lyme disease since 209
- Pertussis since 2017
- Acute respiratory infection since 2017

and 1 non infectious diseases:

- Suicide and attempted suicide since 1997

The surveillance system detects, alerts, and predicts future regional and national epidemics specifically for influenza, gastroenteritis and Varicella zoster. The patient de-identified data is obtained via Internet by the Sentinelles doctors and directly streamed into a Geographic information system (GIS) database. A weekly report, called Sentiweb-Hebdo, is edited every Tuesday on the home webpage of the Sentinelle Network and is emailed to more than 10000 subscribers, including members of the national media. An annual report of the number of cases reported is also edited using the surveillance data. These reports are available for online viewing, and can be accessed on the Sentinelles home webpage in the section titled "documentation/bilans annuels" (or "annual reports and totals").

== Scientific research ==
The data provided by the Sentinelles Network had provided research in the following domains:

- Models of detection and alert systems (Serfling regression methods, Costagliola D. and coll ., Am. J. Public Health, on 1991)
- Prediction models of epidemics involving different geographical levels ("Method of analogues", Viboud C. and coll ., Am J Epidemiol, on 2003).

== Field epidemiology ==
Epidemiological inquiries are regularly performed among the Sentinelles doctors. Their purpose is to maintain the ethical conduct of epidemiological research developed by the "Association des épidémiogistes de langue française", or the Association of Epidemiologists of the French Language. The order of each inquiry is prespecified in a written protocol. The inquiries are then summarized in a final report and submitted per protocol to the internal auditors to assure their quality. All reports thus far have received a favorable recommendation by the CNIL (n°471 393). The results of these inquiries are available online and can be accessed via the Sentinelle home webpage in the section "documentation/enquêtes ponctuelles" (or "regular inquiry documentation").

The first network of sentinel general practitioners was created in Guadeloupe in 1983, followed by those in Martinique and Guyana. The objective of these networks is to monitor pathologies considered to be priorities, in particular: dengue fever, chikungunya, Zika, influenza, bronchiolitis, acute gastroenteritis, chickenpox and conjunctivitis.
