= 2009 swine flu pandemic in Turkey =

2009 flu pandemic in Turkey
- Disease: Swine flu
- Pathogen: H1N1
- First outbreak: Central Mexico
- Arrival date: 16 May 2009
- Confirmed cases: 12,316
- Deaths: 627

The 2009 flu pandemic was a global outbreak of a new strain of influenza A virus subtype H1N1, first identified in April 2009, termed Pandemic H1N1/09 virus by the World Health Organization (WHO) and colloquially called swine flu. The outbreak was first observed in Mexico, and quickly spread globally. On 11 June 2009, WHO declared the outbreak to be a pandemic. The overwhelming majority of patients experience mild symptoms", but some persons are in higher risk groups, such as those with asthma, diabetes, obesity, heart disease, or who are pregnant or have a weakened immune system. In the rare severe cases, around 3–5 days after symptoms manifest, the person's condition declines quickly, often to the point of respiratory failure.

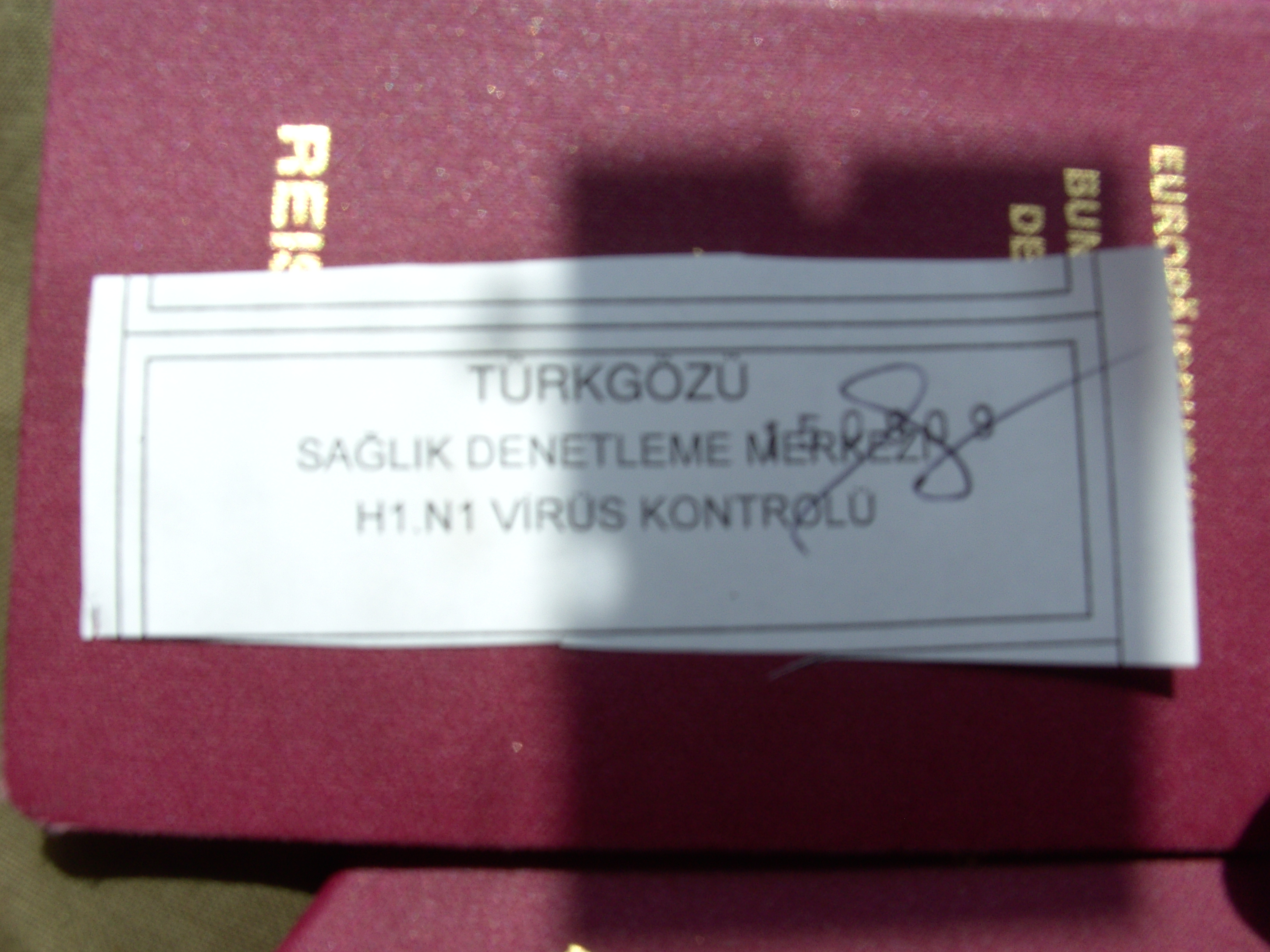
Turkish H1N1 control

The virus reached Turkey in May 2009. A U.S. citizen, flying from the United States via Amsterdam was found to have the swine flu after arriving at Istanbul's Atatürk International Airport. Turkey is the 17th country in Europe and the 36th country in the world to report an incident of swine flu.

The Turkish Government has taken measures at the international airports, using thermal imaging cameras to check passengers coming from international destinations.

The first case of person to person transmission within Turkey was announced on 26 July 2009.

On 2 November, the Turkish Health Ministry began administering vaccines against H1N1 influenza, starting with health workers.

After a slow start, the virus spread rapidly in Turkey and the number of cases reached 12,316. First death confirmed on 24 October and death toll reached 627.

== Timeline ==
Reported deaths by provinces
Province	Confirmed deaths
Total	627
Ankara	34
Istanbul	30
Konya	24
Adana	17
Diyarbakır	10
Gaziantep	9
Kayseri	9
Şanlıurfa	9
Van	9
Bursa	7
Denizli	5
Sivas	5
Tokat	5
Hatay	4
Isparta	4
İzmir	4
Samsun	4
Antalya	3
Elazığ	3
Kahramanmaraş	3
Malatya	3
Batman	2
Eskişehir	2
Giresun	2
Karabük	2
Kocaeli	2
Kütahya	2
Manisa	2
Mersin	2
Niğde	2
Sakarya	2
Afyon	1
Aksaray	1
Amasya	1
Aydın	1
Balıkesir	1
Bingöl	1
Burdur	1
Çorum	1
Düzce	1
Edirne	1
Erzincan	1
Erzurum	1
Kastamonu	1
Kırıkkale	1
Mardin	1
Ordu	1
Osmaniye	1
Siirt	1
Şırnak	1
Tekirdağ	1
Yozgat	1

2009–2010	Milestones of the flu pandemic in Turkey
16 May	First case in Turkey confirmed in Istanbul.
26 July	First case of a person to person transmission confirmed.
24 October	First death in Turkey confirmed in Ankara.
29 October	First death confirmed in Diyarbakır, second overall.
29 October	First death confirmed in Konya, third overall.
1 November	Second death confirmed in Ankara, fourth overall.
1 November	Second death confirmed in Konya, fifth overall.
1 November	Third death confirmed in Konya, sixth overall.
2 November	Mass vaccinations began.
2 November	First death confirmed in Şanlıurfa, seventh overall.
2 November	First death confirmed in Istanbul, eighth overall.
2 November	Third death confirmed in Ankara, ninth overall.
3 November	First death confirmed in Kayseri, tenth overall.
3 November	Eleventh death of Turkey confirmed.
4 November	Three people died in various cities.
4 November	First death confirmed in Batman, fifteenth overall.
5 November	Four people died in various cities.
6 November	Two people died in various cities.
7 November	Two people died in various cities.
8 November	Four people died in various cities.
9 November	Three people died in various cities.
10 November	Six people died in various cities.
11 November	Four people died in various cities.
12–13 November	Twenty people died in various cities.
14–16 November	Thirteen people died in various cities.
17–19 November	Twenty people died in various cities.
20–23 November	Twenty people died in various cities.
24–26 November	Forty-eight people died in various cities.
25–30 November	Thirty-four people died in various cities.
1–3 December	Forty-six people died in various cities.
4–7 December	Fifty-five people died in various cities.
8–10 December	Fifty-seven people died in various cities.
11–14 December	Sixty-two people died in various cities.
15–22 December	Forty-three people died in various cities.
23–29 December	Forty-nine people died in various cities.
30 December–19 January	One hundred and twenty people died in various cities.

== See also ==
- GISAID the Global Initiative on Sharing Avian Influenza Data (also covers novel A/H1N1 swine flu)
