= Mitochondrial ribosomal protein L12 =

Protein-coding gene in the species Homo sapiens

MRPL12
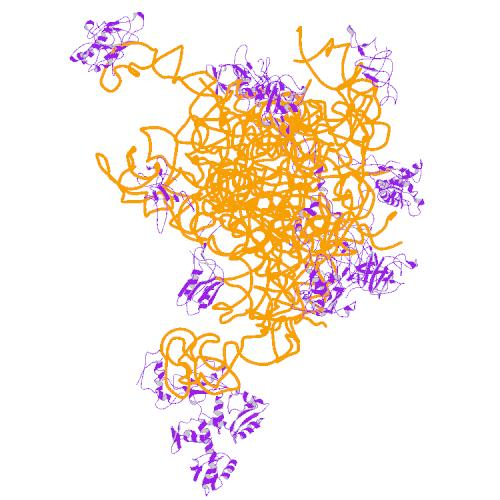

Identifiers
- Aliases: MRPL12, 5c5-2, L12mt, MRP-L31/34, MRPL7, MRPL7/L12, RPML12, mitochondrial ribosomal protein L12
- External IDs: OMIM: 602375; MGI: 1926273; GeneCards: MRPL12

Gene location (Human)
Chr.	Chromosome 17 (human)
Band	17q25.3	Start	81,703,367 bp
Band	17q25.3	End	81,707,517 bp
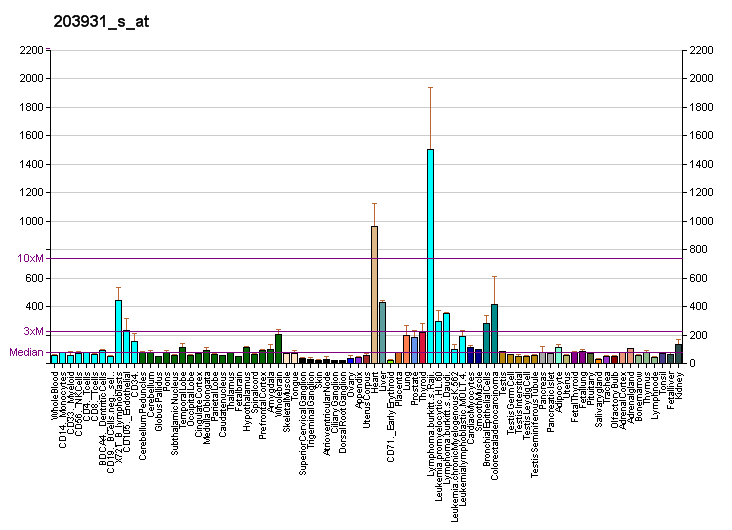
RNA expression pattern
Bgee	Human / Mouse (ortholog); Top expressed in: apex of heart; mucosa of transverse colon; left ventricle; right auricle of heart; muscle of thigh; right lobe of liver; gastrocnemius muscle; mucosa of esophagus; human kidney; skeletal muscle tissue / n/a; More reference expression data
BioGPS	More reference expression data
Gene ontology
Molecular function	structural constituent of ribosome; protein binding; RNA binding
Cellular component	mitochondrial inner membrane; ribosome; intracellular anatomical structure; mitochondrial large ribosomal subunit; mitochondrion
Biological process	positive regulation of transcription, DNA-templated; mitochondrial transcription; mitochondrial translational elongation; mitochondrial translational termination; protein biosynthesis
Sources:Amigo / QuickGO
Orthologs
Databases	NCBI: entry; OMA: entry
Species	Human	Mouse
Entrez	6182	56282
Ensembl	ENSG00000262814	ENSMUSG00000039640
UniProt	P52815	Q9DB15
RefSeq (mRNA)	NM_002949	NM_027204
RefSeq (protein)	NP_002940	NP_081480
Location (UCSC)	Chr 17: 81.7 – 81.71 Mb	n/a
PubMed search
- Wikidata
View/Edit Human	View/Edit Mouse

39S ribosomal protein L12, mitochondrial is a protein that in humans is encoded by the MRPL12 gene.

Mammalian mitochondrial ribosomal proteins are encoded by nuclear genes and help in protein synthesis within the mitochondrion. Mitochondrial ribosomes (mitoribosomes) consist of a small 28S subunit and a large 39S subunit. They have an estimated 75% protein to rRNA composition compared to prokaryotic ribosomes, where this ratio is reversed. Another difference between mammalian mitoribosomes and prokaryotic ribosomes is that the latter contain a 5S rRNA. Among different species, the proteins comprising the mitoribosome differ greatly in sequence, and sometimes in biochemical properties, which prevents easy recognition by sequence homology. This gene encodes a 39S subunit protein which forms homodimers. In prokaryotic ribosomes, two L7/L12 dimers and one L10 protein form the L8 protein complex.
