= 60S acidic ribosomal protein P1 =

Protein found in humans

RPLP1

Identifiers
- Aliases: RPLP1, LP1, P1, RPP1, ribosomal protein lateral stalk subunit P1
- External IDs: OMIM: 180520; MGI: 1927099; GeneCards: RPLP1
Available structures
PDB	Ortholog search: PDBe RCSB
PDB	List of PDB id codes 2LBF, 4BEH, 4V6X,%%s4V6X, 4BEH

Gene location (Human)
Chr.	Chromosome 15 (human)
Band	15q23	Start	69,452,814 bp
Band	15q23	End	69,456,205 bp

Gene location (Mouse)
Chr.	Chromosome 9 (mouse)
Band	9|9 B	Start	61,820,566 bp
Band	9|9 B	End	61,821,824 bp
RNA expression pattern
Bgee	Human / Mouse (ortholog); Top expressed in: epithelium of bronchus; thymus; trachea; synovial membrane; quadriceps femoris muscle; spinal ganglia; vastus lateralis muscle; bone marrow cell; skin of leg; skin of abdomen / Top expressed in: embryo; epiblast; lip; embryo; spleen; urinary bladder; ventricular zone; thymus; lens; bone marrow; More reference expression data
BioGPS	n/a
Gene ontology
Molecular function	structural constituent of ribosome; protein binding; protein kinase activator activity; ribonucleoprotein complex binding
Cellular component	cytosol; ribosome; focal adhesion; intracellular anatomical structure; cytosolic large ribosomal subunit; extracellular exosome
Biological process	viral transcription; SRP-dependent cotranslational protein targeting to membrane; translational initiation; nuclear-transcribed mRNA catabolic process, nonsense-mediated decay; translational elongation; activation of protein kinase activity; cytoplasmic translation; positive regulation of protein kinase activity; protein biosynthesis; rRNA processing
Sources:Amigo / QuickGO
Orthologs
Databases	NCBI: entry; OMA: entry
Species	Human	Mouse
Entrez	6176	56040
Ensembl	ENSG00000137818	ENSMUSG00000007892
UniProt	P05386	P47955
RefSeq (mRNA)	NM_213725; NM_001003	NM_018853
RefSeq (protein)	NP_000994; NP_998890; NP_000994.1	NP_061341
Location (UCSC)	Chr 15: 69.45 – 69.46 Mb	Chr 9: 61.82 – 61.82 Mb
PubMed search
- Wikidata
View/Edit Human	View/Edit Mouse

60S acidic ribosomal protein P1 is a protein that in humans is encoded by the RPLP1 gene.

== Function ==
Ribosomes, the organelles that catalyze protein synthesis, consist of a small 40S subunit and a large 60S subunit. Together these subunits are composed of 4 RNA species and approximately 80 structurally distinct proteins. This gene encodes a ribosomal phosphoprotein that is a component of the 60S subunit. The protein, which is a functional equivalent of the Escherichia coli L7/L12 ribosomal protein, belongs to the L12P family of ribosomal proteins. It plays an important role in the elongation step of protein synthesis. Unlike most ribosomal proteins, which are basic, the encoded protein is acidic. Its C-terminal end is nearly identical to the C-terminal ends of the ribosomal phosphoproteins P0 and P2. The P1 protein can interact with P0 and P2 to form a pentameric complex consisting of P1 and P2 dimers, and a P0 monomer. The protein is located in the cytoplasm. Two alternatively spliced transcript variants that encode different proteins have been observed. As is typical for genes encoding ribosomal proteins, there are multiple processed pseudogenes of this gene dispersed through the genome.

== Interactions ==
RPLP1 has been shown to interact with RPLP2.

RPLP1 has also been found to bind with CSFV (Swine Flu), potentially contributing to the rate in which the virus spreads.
