= U70 =

U70 may refer to:

- U-70 (synchrotron), a Soviet proton synchrotron
- French sloop Commandant Dominé
- German submarine U-70, various vessels
- Great dodecahemidodecahedron
- Small nucleolar RNA SNORA70
- VGV U70, a Chinese SUV
- U70, a line of the Düsseldorf Stadtbahn
