= U65 =

U65 may refer to:

- German submarine U-65, various vessels
- Great dodecahemicosahedron
- HMS Wellington (U65), a sloop of the Royal Navy
- Small nucleolar RNA SNORA65
