= 2009 swine flu pandemic in Mexico =

Cases of H1N1 swine flu by state
State	Lab confirmed cases* (increase in October)	Deaths
Mexico (total)	50,234 (+17,284)	398
Aguascalientes	603 (+378)	8
Baja California	1,642 (+699)	19
Baja California Sur	470 (+253)	4
Campeche	167 (+2)	1
Chiapas	3,602 (+26)	35
Chihuahua	536 (+238)	2
Coahuila	170 (+40)	1
Colima	969 (+170)	0
Durango	684 (+456)	2
Guanajuato	1,069 (+428)	26
Guerrero	1,744 (+675)	11
Hidalgo	1,560 (+624)	10
Jalisco	2,455 (+592)	15
Federal District	5,731 (+2,193)	80
Mexico State	2,087 (+1,059)	47
Michoacán	2,017 (+933)	4
Morelos	428 (+243)	2
Nayarit	1,379 (+911)	2
Nuevo León	2,775 (+1,400)	12
Oaxaca	1,737 (+518)	12
Puebla	1,423 (+694)	18
Querétaro	1,376 (+649)	5
Quintana Roo	635 (+41)	1
San Luis Potosí	2,588 (+1,040)	13
Sinaloa	533 (+108)	7
Sonora	1,915 (+962)	11
Tabasco	1,063 (+19)	3
Tamaulipas	1,818 (+495)	10
Tlaxcala	1,359 (+606)	9
Veracruz	1,901 (+429)	10
Yucatán	3,074 (+71)	10
Zacatecas	705 (+227)	8
(*) Laboratory-confirmed cases of pandemic (H1N1) 2009 as officially confirmed by the Secretaría de Salud de México. Updated: October 29, 2009.

In March and April 2009, an outbreak of a new strain of influenza commonly referred to as "swine flu" infected many people in Mexico and other parts of the world, causing illness ranging from mild to severe. Initial reports suggested that the outbreak had started in February due to farming practices at a pig farm half-owned by Smithfield Foods. Smithfield Foods stated that it had found no clinical signs or symptoms of the presence of swine influenza in the company's swine herd, or among its employees at its joint ventures in Mexico, that it routinely administers influenza virus vaccination to their swine herds and that it conducts monthly testing for the presence of swine influenza. The new strain was identified as a combination of several different strains of Influenzavirus A, subtype H1N1, including separate strains of this subtype circulating in humans and in pigs.

The World Health Organization (WHO) and the U.S. Centers for Disease Control and Prevention (CDC) expressed serious concerns that the new strain, which transmits between humans and has had a relatively high mortality rate in the possible and confirmed Mexican cases, has the potential to become an influenza pandemic. It was reported that, because the virus was already widespread, containment would be impossible. The WHO declared a public health emergency of international concern in response to the outbreak on April 25, 2009.

As of April 27, 2009, all schools nationwide remained closed until at least May 6, with "non-essential" businesses ordered to close as of April 30. Health Minister Córdova noted that the number of new cases had declined during the three days: from 141 on Saturday to 119 on Sunday and 110 on Monday. It is unclear why there were more deaths in Mexico than in other areas, as there were multiple potential variables, such as a stronger strain of the virus or more exposure to it. No definite conclusion had been reached, however the CDC reported that swine flu viruses in the US and Mexico matched.

== Outbreak ==
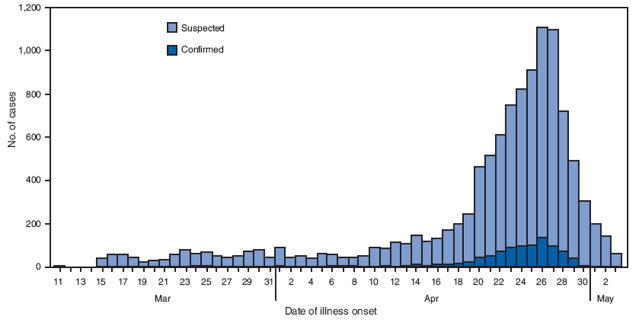
Number of cases in Mexico by date of illness onset, March 11 through May 3, 2009.

The first infected was registered in San Diego, California, on April 2, 2009, but it was misclassified as an H2N3 case. It was not until April 13, with the first death in Oaxaca, that further research was carried out, officially detecting the new type of virus on April 16. The pandemic outbreak was first detected in the Federal District, where surveillance began picking up a surge in cases of influenza-like illness starting on March 18. The surge was assumed by authorities to be "late-season flu" (which usually coincides with a mild Influenzavirus B peak) until April 21, when a CDC alert concerning two isolated cases of a novel swine flu was reported in the media (see 2009 swine flu outbreak in the United States). Both cases were in US counties on the Mexico – United States border, adjacent to one state in Mexico where the influenza surge had been detected. This was the missing link that connected the surge and the new strain, and established the high suspicion of an outbreak. One study estimated that by the end of April, at least 113,000 to 375,000 people in Mexico had been infected. Then, in early May, influenza activity began to decline, likely due to the shutdown of most public places in response to the outbreak. However, H1N1 remains present in Mexico, and as of December, was classified by the WHO as widespread.

== Confirmed cases ==
Outbreak evolution in Mexico: Deaths Confirmed cases

Outbreak evolution in Mexico: 2000+ cases 500+ cases 100+ cases 1+ cases

Outbreak evolution in Mexico: 0 deaths suspected deaths 1+ deaths 5+ deaths 20+ deaths 100+ deaths

Dr. José Ángel Córdova Villalobos, the federal Secretary of Health, stated on April 25, 2009, that since March, there had been over 1300 reported cases and put the death toll at 83, with 20 confirmed to be linked to a new swine influenza strain of Influenza A virus subtype H1N1. As of April 26 there had been 1,614 cases, with 103 deaths and about 400 patients in hospitals. Around two-thirds of the sick patients had recovered.

However, flu death toll in Mexico could be lower than first thought, said Dr. Gerald Evans, head of the Association of Medical Microbiology and Infectious Disease Canada and a member of a federal pandemic-planning committee, on April 29:

There was a lot of speculation and what seemed to be evidence there were dozens and dozens of deaths. Careful analysis showed these people likely died of something else, and not flu. That's really good news, and that would fit with what we've seen outside of Mexico.

== Response ==
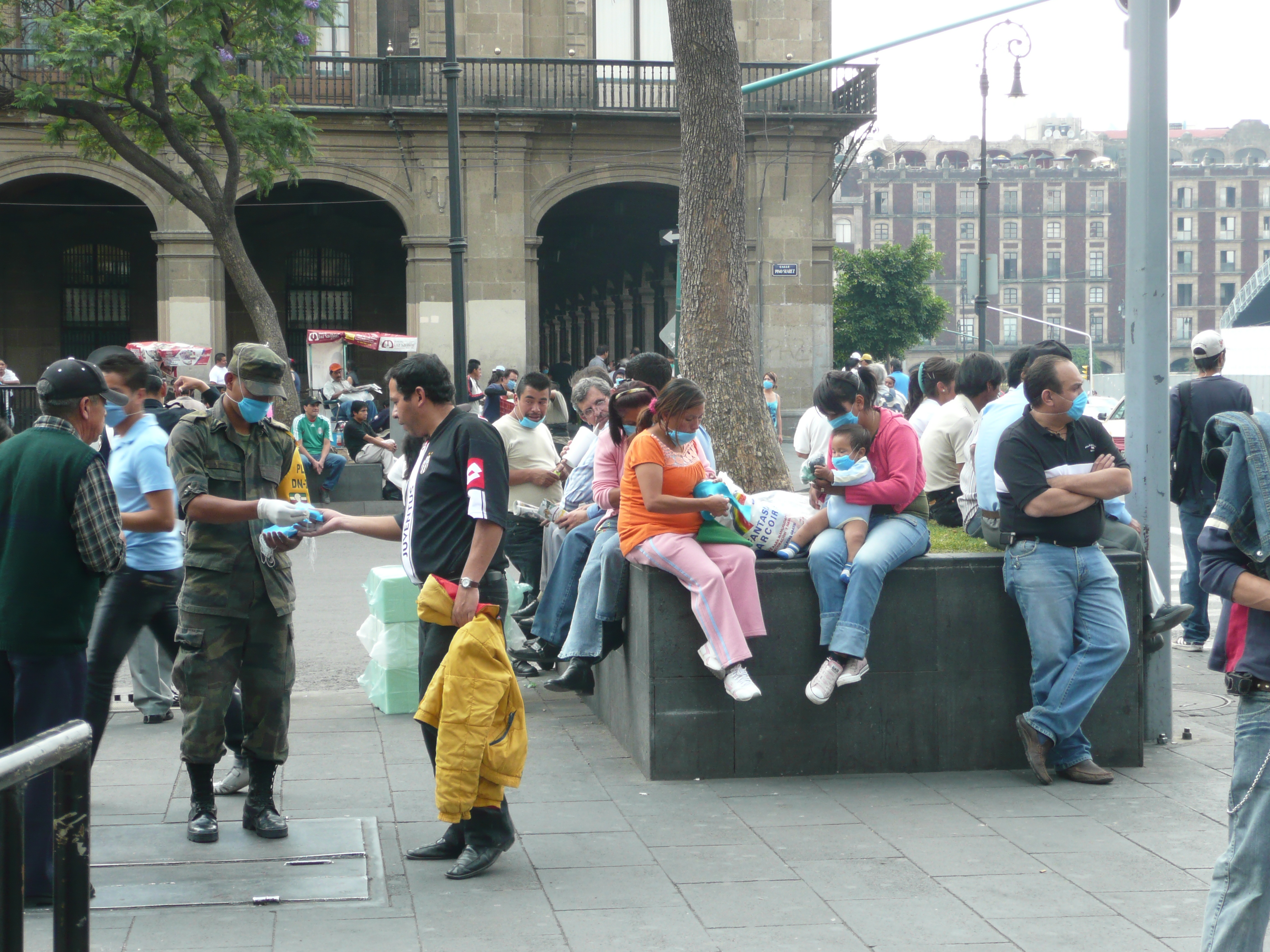
Mexican soldiers distributing protective masks to citizens.

Both the World Health Organization and the U.S. Centers for Disease Control and Prevention have praised the response by the Mexican government, calling it "a model of rapid and transparent reporting, aggressive control measures, and generous sharing of data and samples" in addition to labeling it "courageous and impressive".

After a month since the first atypical pneumonia cases were detected, the Mexican government responded and established some measures in Mexico City, the State of Mexico, and State of San Luis Potosí, where the swine flu had spread, to decrease the risk of more infections. Hundreds of soldiers and police officers mobilized by the government handed out six million surgical masks to citizens in and around Mexico City. On April 24, 2009, schools (from pre-school to university level) as well as libraries, museums, concerts, and other large public gathering places, were shut down by the government in Mexico City, and the neighboring State of Mexico to prevent the disease from spreading further; schools in Mexico City, the State of Mexico, and the state of San Luis Potosí would remain closed through at least May 5. Marcelo Ebrard, Mexico City's mayor, also asked all night-life facilities operators to shut down their businesses for ten days to prevent further infections. Health Secretary José Ángel Córdova said on April 24 that schools would probably be suspended for at least the following week then, and that it will take around ten days to see the evolution of the virus' behavior, and consider other measures thereafter. On April 25, President Felipe Calderón declared an emergency, which granted him the power to suspend public events and order quarantines. Hours later, Córdova announced classes would officially be suspended through May. 6 On April 26, Natividad González Parás, governor of the northeastern state of Nuevo León, announced that statewide schools would remain closed until May 6, and established a quarantine system in airports, central bus stations, and the creation of observation points, mainly in the southern part of the state, at the nearest highways to the borders with other states, to realize tests conducted on people arriving from other states. Classes in Coahuila were cancelled on April 27 and 28, with the possibility of cancelling the rest of the week. On April 27, Health Secretary José Ángel Córdova announced that schools of all levels throughout the nation would be suspended until May 6 to prevent the spread of the flu.

As part of a marketing strategy, a mascot for the outbreak was released in Mexico City on April 29 depicting a blue plush virus with black eyes in reference of H1N1, but it was discontinued two days later due to the negative press coverage it received.

== Economic impact ==
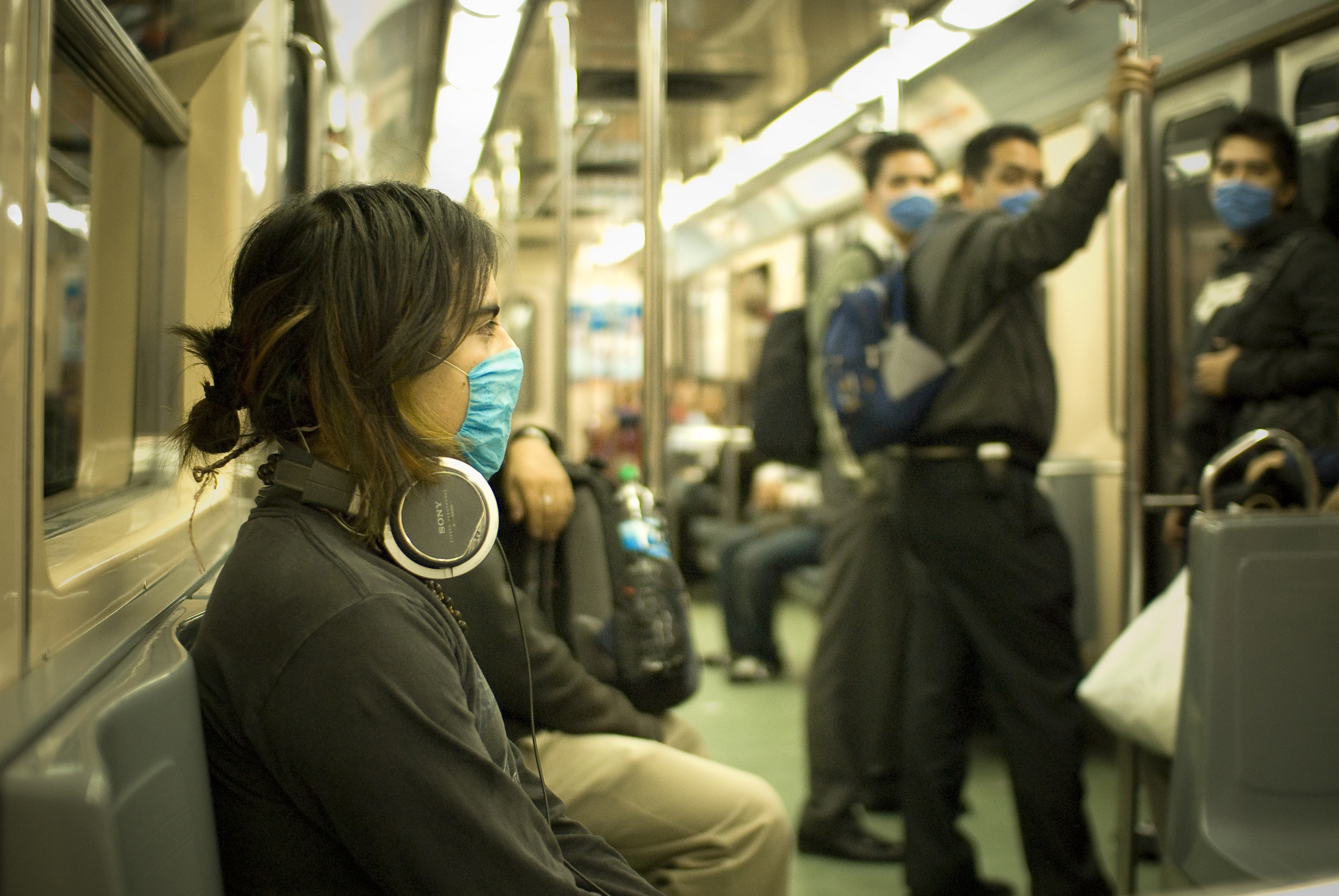
People in Mexico City wear masks on a train due to the swine flu outbreak, April 2009

The outbreak increased the strain on an economy already under pressure from the current economic crisis. Although the World Bank said it would extend Mexico $25 million in loans for immediate aid and $180 million in long-term assistance, it wasn't enough to restore customer investor confidence leading to the peso’s biggest tumble in six months. It soon seemed likely now that Mexico would have to draw on a $47 billion credit line from the International Monetary Fund.

It has been reported that the food services sector within Mexico City experienced losses of over US$4.5 million per day. It has also been reported that pork meat prices dropped 30% within Mexico; combined with several export bans, this inflicted severe damage to the industry. Although the virus hadn't spread throughout the whole country, as a precaution, all mass gatherings were prohibited, affecting the sports industry. Many Liga MX México Primera División teams reported direct losses of over $900,000 per game, after the Mexican Football Federation ordered all pro soccer games in Mexico to be played without fans in an effort to slow the spread of the virus. It also prompted cancellations of all the festivals in the country. Additionally, the Mexican race of the 2008–09 A1 GP season had to be cancelled because of the outbreak.

The Mexican teams that qualified to the 2009 Copa Libertadores also began to have problems related to the swine flu outbreak, especially Chivas de Guadalajara, which travelled to Chile to play against Everton. Later, because of the other teams not wanting to risk their players getting infected, CONMEBOL asked Guadalajara and San Luis clubs to play their games outside Mexico; both teams declined to do so, and were withdrawn, with Mexico dismissed from competitions. Days later, CONMEBOL reconsidered their actions, and seeded the teams in the next Libertadores Cup for the Round of 16.

== See also ==
- Healthcare in Mexico
- Swine influenza
- Avian influenza
- COVID-19 pandemic in Mexico
- Severe acute respiratory syndrome (SARS)
- 2009 swine flu pandemic in the United States
