= 60S acidic ribosomal protein P2 =

Protein found in humans

RPLP2
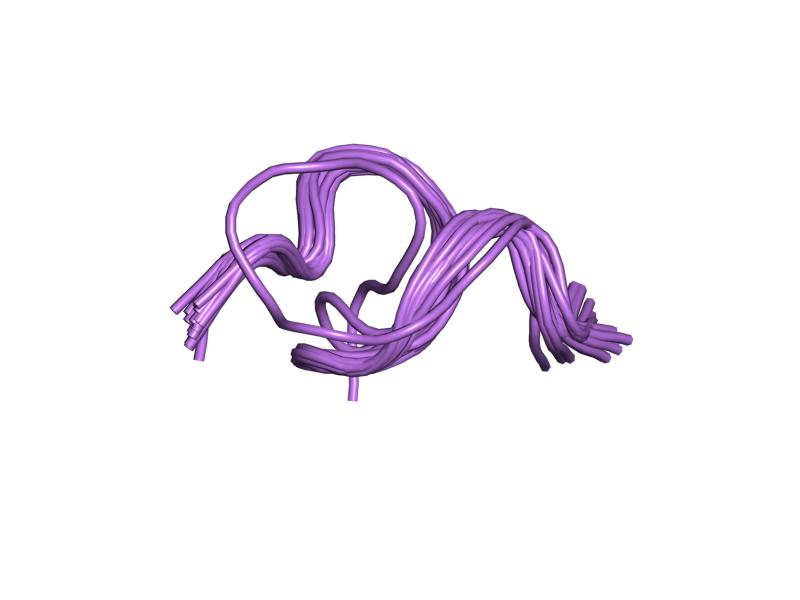

Identifiers
- Aliases: RPLP2, D11S2243E, LP2, P2, RPP2, ribosomal protein lateral stalk subunit P2
- External IDs: OMIM: 180530; MGI: 1914436; GeneCards: RPLP2
Available structures
PDB	Ortholog search: PDBe RCSB
PDB	List of PDB id codes 1S4J, 2JDL, 2LBF, 2W1O, 4BEH, 4V6X

Gene location (Human)
Chr.	Chromosome 11 (human)
Band	11p15.5	Start	809,965 bp
Band	11p15.5	End	812,880 bp
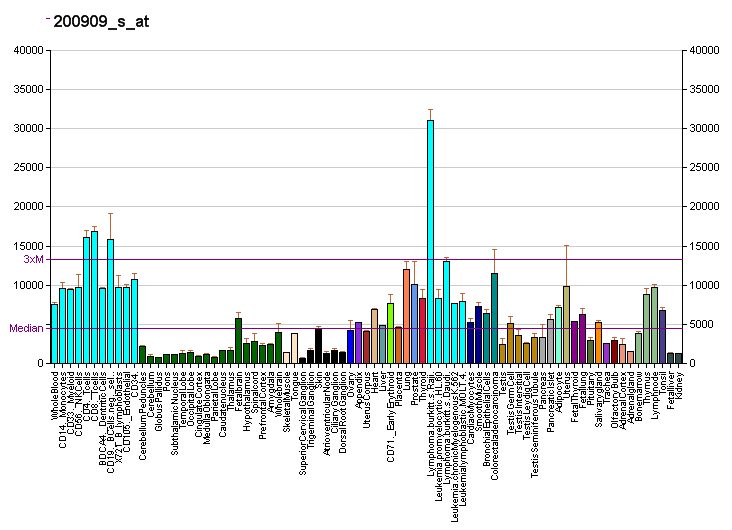
RNA expression pattern
Bgee	Human / Mouse (ortholog); Top expressed in: nipple; tendon of biceps brachii; skin of hip; gonad; abdominal fat; lower lobe of lung; superficial temporal artery; peritoneum; pericardium; urethra / n/a; More reference expression data
BioGPS	More reference expression data
Gene ontology
Molecular function	structural constituent of ribosome; protein binding
Cellular component	cytosol; ribosome; membrane; focal adhesion; intracellular anatomical structure; cytosolic large ribosomal subunit; extracellular exosome; synapse
Biological process	viral transcription; SRP-dependent cotranslational protein targeting to membrane; translational initiation; nuclear-transcribed mRNA catabolic process, nonsense-mediated decay; cytoplasmic translation; translational elongation; protein biosynthesis; rRNA processing
Sources:Amigo / QuickGO
Orthologs
Databases	NCBI: entry; OMA: entry
Species	Human	Mouse
Entrez	6181	67186
Ensembl	ENSG00000177600	ENSMUSG00000025508
UniProt	P05387	P99027
RefSeq (mRNA)	NM_001004	NM_026020; NM_001360657; NM_001360658
RefSeq (protein)	NP_000995	NP_080296; NP_001347586; NP_001347587
Location (UCSC)	Chr 11: 0.81 – 0.81 Mb	n/a
PubMed search
- Wikidata
View/Edit Human	View/Edit Mouse

60S acidic ribosomal protein P2 is a protein that in humans is encoded by the RPLP2 gene.

Ribosomes, the organelles that catalyze protein synthesis, consist of a small 40S subunit and a large 60S subunit. Together these subunits are composed of 4 RNA species and approximately 80 structurally distinct proteins. This gene encodes a ribosomal phosphoprotein that is a component of the 60S subunit. The protein, which is a functional equivalent of the Escherichia coli L7/L12 ribosomal protein, belongs to the L12P family of ribosomal proteins. It plays an important role in the elongation step of protein synthesis. Unlike most ribosomal proteins, which are basic, the encoded protein is acidic. Its C-terminal end is nearly identical to the C-terminal ends of the ribosomal phosphoproteins P0 and P1. The P2 protein can interact with P0 and P1 to form a pentameric complex consisting of P1 and P2 dimers, and a P0 monomer. The protein is located in the cytoplasm. As is typical for genes encoding ribosomal proteins, there are multiple processed pseudogenes of this gene dispersed through the genome.

== Interactions ==
RPLP2 has been shown to interact with RPLP1.
