= 60S acidic ribosomal protein P0 =

Protein found in humans

RPLP0

Identifiers
- Aliases: RPLP0, L10E, LP0, P0, PRLP0, RPP0, ribosomal protein lateral stalk subunit P0
- External IDs: OMIM: 180510; MGI: 1927636; GeneCards: RPLP0
Available structures
PDB	Ortholog search: PDBe RCSB
PDB	List of PDB id codes 4V6X, 5AJ0, 3J92, 4V5Z,%%s4V5Z, 5AJ0, 4V6X, 3J92

Gene location (Human)
Chr.	Chromosome 12 (human)
Band	12q24.23	Start	120,196,699 bp
Band	12q24.23	End	120,201,235 bp

Gene location (Mouse)
Chr.	Chromosome 5 (mouse)
Band	5|5 F	Start	115,697,526 bp
Band	5|5 F	End	115,701,786 bp
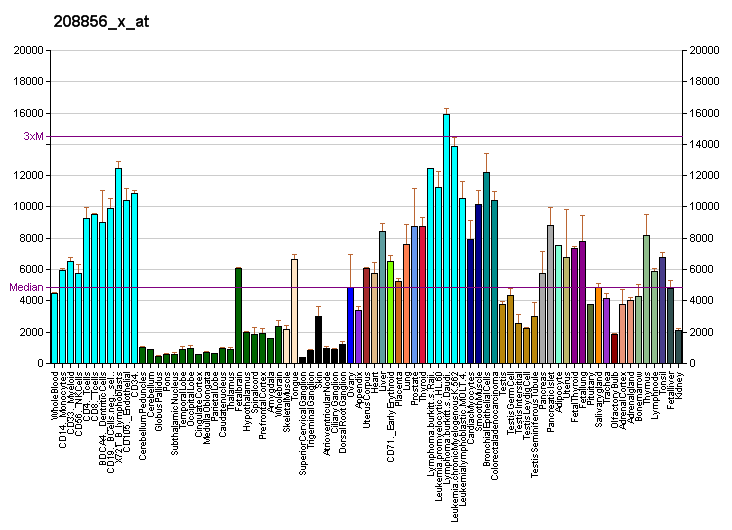

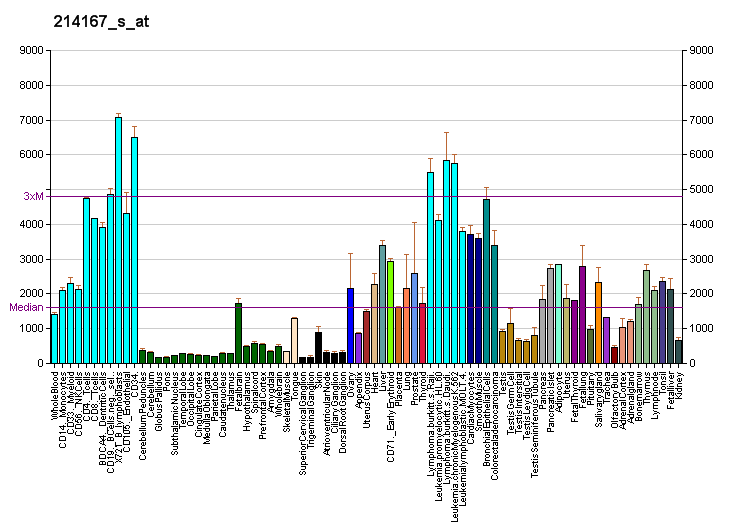

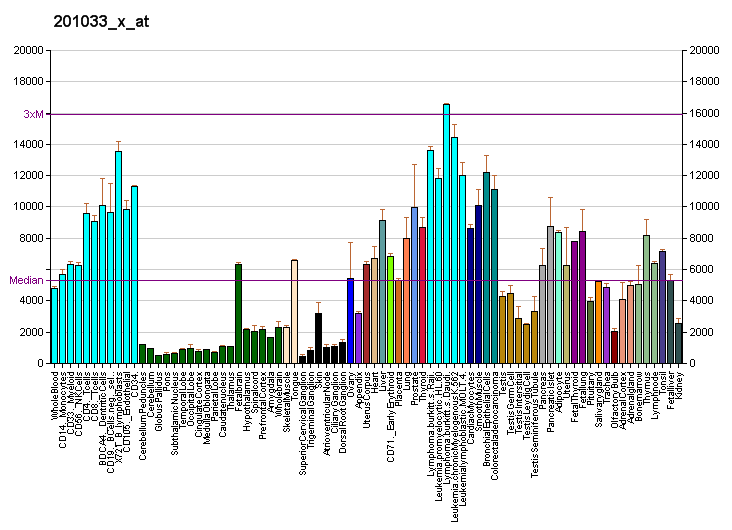
RNA expression pattern
Bgee	Human / Mouse (ortholog); Top expressed in: gonad; stromal cell of endometrium; ventricular zone; mucosa of esophagus; skin of leg; islet of Langerhans; ganglionic eminence; right uterine tube; skin of abdomen; right ovary / Top expressed in: epiblast; ventricular zone; embryo; lip; embryo; ganglionic eminence; zone of skin; esophagus; urinary bladder; lens; More reference expression data
BioGPS	More reference expression data
Gene ontology
Molecular function	protein binding; structural constituent of ribosome; RNA binding; large ribosomal subunit rRNA binding; peptide binding
Cellular component	ribosome; focal adhesion; intracellular anatomical structure; cytoplasmic ribonucleoprotein granule; cytosolic large ribosomal subunit; extracellular exosome; cytoplasm; nucleus; endoplasmic reticulum; cytosol; membrane; postsynaptic density; postsynapse; ribonucleoprotein complex; dendrite; synapse
Biological process	ribosome biogenesis; viral transcription; SRP-dependent cotranslational protein targeting to membrane; translational initiation; nuclear-transcribed mRNA catabolic process, nonsense-mediated decay; protein biosynthesis; rRNA processing; viral process; interleukin-12-mediated signaling pathway; ribosomal large subunit assembly; cytoplasmic translation; lactation; response to selenium ion; cellular response to cAMP; cellular response to interleukin-4; cellular response to Thyroid stimulating hormone; cellular response to phorbol 13-acetate 12-myristate
Sources:Amigo / QuickGO
Orthologs
Databases	NCBI: entry; OMA: entry
Species	Human	Mouse
Entrez	6175	11837
Ensembl	ENSG00000089157	ENSMUSG00000067274
UniProt	P05388	P14869
RefSeq (mRNA)	NM_053275; NM_001002	NM_007475
RefSeq (protein)	NP_000993; NP_444505; NP_000993.1; NP_444505.1	NP_031501
Location (UCSC)	Chr 12: 120.2 – 120.2 Mb	Chr 5: 115.7 – 115.7 Mb
PubMed search
- Wikidata
View/Edit Human	View/Edit Mouse

60S acidic ribosomal protein P0 is a protein that in humans is encoded by the RPLP0 gene.

Ribosomes catalyze protein synthesis and consist of a small 40S subunit and a large 60S subunit. Together these subunits are composed of 4 RNA species and approximately 80 structurally distinct proteins. This gene encodes a ribosomal protein that is a component of the 60S subunit. The protein, which is the functional equivalent of the E. coli L10 ribosomal protein, belongs to the L10P family of ribosomal proteins. It is a neutral phosphoprotein with a C-terminal end that is nearly identical to the C-terminal ends of the acidic ribosomal phosphoproteins P1 and P2. The P0 protein can interact with P1 and P2 to form a pentameric complex consisting of P1 and P2 dimers, and a P0 monomer. The protein is located in the cytoplasm. Transcript variants derived from alternative splicing exist; they encode the same protein. As is typical for genes encoding ribosomal proteins, there are multiple processed pseudogenes of this gene dispersed through the genome.
