= ZNF16 =

Protein-coding gene in the species Homo sapiens

Identifiers
- Aliases: ZNF16, HZF1, KOX9, zinc finger protein 16
- External IDs: OMIM: 601262; GeneCards: ZNF16

Gene location (Human)
Chr.	Chromosome 8 (human)
Band	8q24.3	Start	144,930,358 bp
Band	8q24.3	End	144,950,888 bp
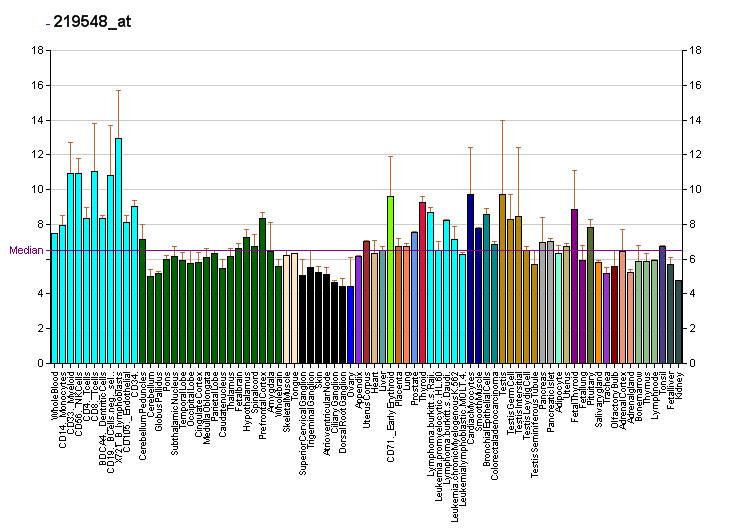
RNA expression pattern
Bgee	Human / Mouse (ortholog); Top expressed in: gonad; testicle; oocyte; ganglionic eminence; gastrocnemius muscle; muscle of thigh; secondary oocyte; ventricular zone; skin of leg; gingival epithelium / n/a; More reference expression data
BioGPS	More reference expression data
Gene ontology
Molecular function	DNA-binding transcription factor activity; DNA binding; protein binding; metal ion binding; nucleic acid binding; DNA-binding transcription factor activity, RNA polymerase II-specific
Cellular component	nucleus; nucleolus
Biological process	positive regulation of cell cycle phase transition; positive regulation of kinase activity; cell cycle; negative regulation of apoptotic process; regulation of transcription, DNA-templated; positive regulation of megakaryocyte differentiation; positive regulation of cell division; positive regulation of erythrocyte differentiation; transcription, DNA-templated; positive regulation of cell population proliferation; cellular response to sodium dodecyl sulfate; cell division; regulation of transcription by RNA polymerase II
Sources:Amigo / QuickGO
Orthologs
Databases	NCBI: entry; OMA: entry
Species	Human	Mouse
Entrez	7564	n/a
Ensembl	ENSG00000170631	n/a
UniProt	P17020	n/a
RefSeq (mRNA)	NM_001029976; NM_006958	n/a
RefSeq (protein)	NP_001025147; NP_008889	n/a
Location (UCSC)	Chr 8: 144.93 – 144.95 Mb	n/a
PubMed search		n/a
- Wikidata
View/Edit Human

Zinc finger protein 16 is a protein that in humans is encoded by the ZNF16 gene.

The protein encoded by this gene contains a Cys_{2}His_{2} type of zinc finger, and thus may function as a transcription factor. This gene is located in a region close to ZNF7/KOX4, a gene also encoding a zinc finger protein, on chromosome 8. Two alternatively spliced variants, encoding the same protein, have been identified.
