= Influenza A virus subtype H3N1 =

Virus classification
- (unranked): Virus
- Realm: Riboviria
- Kingdom: Orthornavirae
- Phylum: Negarnaviricota
- Class: Insthoviricetes
- Order: Articulavirales
- Family: Orthomyxoviridae
- Genus: Alphainfluenzavirus
- Species: Influenza A virus
- Serotype: Influenza A virus subtype H3N1

Virus subtype

H3N1 is a subtype of the species Influenza A virus, mostly affecting pigs.

The known subtypes of Influenza A virus that create influenza in pigs and are endemic in pigs are H1N1, H1N2, H3N1 and H3N2.

== See also ==
strains named by isolate

- Fujian flu

strains named by typical host

- Bird flu
- Dog flu
- Horse flu
- Human flu
- Swine flu
