= Influenza A virus subtype H1N2v =

Influenza A virus

Virus classification
- (unranked): Virus
- Realm: Riboviria
- Kingdom: Orthornavirae
- Phylum: Negarnaviricota
- Class: Insthoviricetes
- Order: Articulavirales
- Family: Orthomyxoviridae
- Genus: Alphainfluenzavirus
- Species: Influenza A virus

Variant of the flu virus, H1N2

Influenza A virus subtype H1N2v is a variant of the flu virus, H1N2. Most reported cases have resulted in mild upper respiratory tract symptoms.

== Signs and symptoms ==
Clinical features are typically of mild upper respiratory tract symptoms.

== Epidemiology ==
Between 2005 and November 2023, there have been around 50 reported cases of H1N2v in humans worldwide. It has generally affected children. Most have been reported in the United States. Others have included Brazil and Vietnam. In November 2023, the UK reported its first case in a human.
