= ZNF7 =

Protein-coding gene in the species Homo sapiens

Identifiers
- Aliases: ZNF7, HF.16, KOX4, zf30, zinc finger protein 7
- External IDs: OMIM: 194531; MGI: 99208; GeneCards: ZNF7

Gene location (Human)
Chr.	Chromosome 8 (human)
Band	8q24.3	Start	144,827,518 bp
Band	8q24.3	End	144,847,509 bp

Gene location (Mouse)
Chr.	Chromosome 15 (mouse)
Band	15 D3|15 36.28 cM	Start	76,763,459 bp
Band	15 D3|15 36.28 cM	End	76,776,595 bp
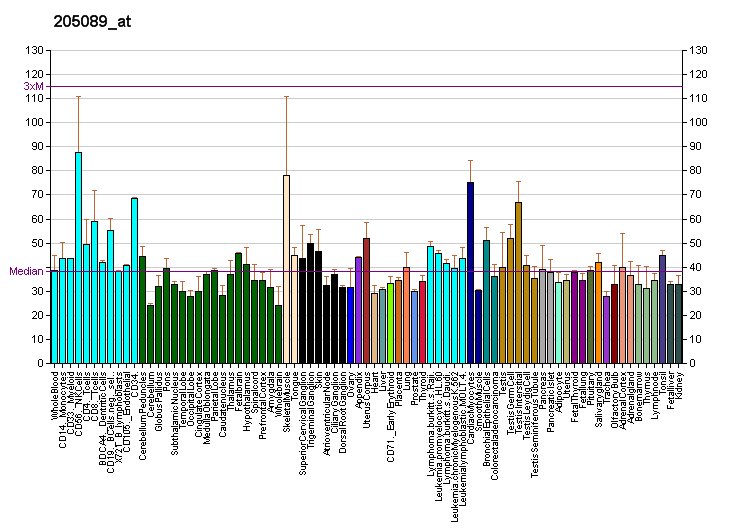
RNA expression pattern
Bgee	Human / Mouse (ortholog); Top expressed in: right hemisphere of cerebellum; gonad; testicle; gastrocnemius muscle; granulocyte; apex of heart; right lobe of thyroid gland; left uterine tube; skin of leg; tibial nerve / Top expressed in: tail of embryo; outer renal medulla; genital tubercle; epiblast; inner renal medulla; embryo; connecting tubule; medullary collecting duct; transitional epithelium of urinary bladder; embryo; More reference expression data
BioGPS	More reference expression data
Gene ontology
Molecular function	DNA-binding transcription factor activity; DNA binding; metal ion binding; nucleic acid binding; DNA-binding transcription factor activity, RNA polymerase II-specific
Cellular component	intracellular anatomical structure; nucleus
Biological process	multicellular organism development; regulation of transcription, DNA-templated; transcription, DNA-templated; regulation of transcription by RNA polymerase II
Sources:Amigo / QuickGO
Orthologs
Databases	NCBI: entry; OMA: entry
Species	Human	Mouse
Entrez	7553	223669
Ensembl	ENSG00000147789	ENSMUSG00000033669
UniProt	P17097	Q3TFZ4
RefSeq (mRNA)	NM_001282795; NM_001282796; NM_001282797; NM_003416; NM_001330623 NM_001349805; NM_001349806; NM_001349807; NM_001349808; NM_001349809	NM_145916; NM_001358816; NM_001358817; NM_001358818
RefSeq (protein)	NP_001269724; NP_001269725; NP_001269726; NP_001317552; NP_003407 NP_001336734; NP_001336735; NP_001336736; NP_001336737; NP_001336738	NP_666021; NP_001345745; NP_001345746; NP_001345747
Location (UCSC)	Chr 8: 144.83 – 144.85 Mb	Chr 15: 76.76 – 76.78 Mb
PubMed search
- Wikidata
View/Edit Human	View/Edit Mouse

Zinc finger protein 7 is a protein that in humans is encoded by the ZNF7 gene.

== Interactions ==
ZNF7 has been shown to interact with RPL7.
