= Influenza A virus subtype H2N3 =

Virus classification
- (unranked): Virus
- Realm: Riboviria
- Kingdom: Orthornavirae
- Phylum: Negarnaviricota
- Class: Insthoviricetes
- Order: Articulavirales
- Family: Orthomyxoviridae
- Genus: Alphainfluenzavirus
- Species: Influenza A virus
- Serotype: Influenza A virus subtype H2N3

Subtype of Influenza A virus

H2N3 is a subtype of the influenza A virus. Its name derives from the forms of the two kinds of proteins on the surface of its coat, hemagglutinin (H) and neuraminidase (N). H2N3 viruses can infect birds and mammals.

== Overview ==
According to research published by the US National Institutes of Health, the triple reassortant H2N3 virus isolated from diseased pigs in the United States in 2006 is pathogenic for certain mammals without prior adaptation and transmits among swine and ferrets. Adaptation, in the H2 hemagglutinin derived from an avian virus, includes the ability to bind to the mammalian receptor, a significant prerequisite for infection of mammals, in particular humans, which poses a big concern for public health. Researchers investigated the pathogenic potential of swine H2N3 in Cynomolgus macaques, a surrogate model for human influenza infection. In contrast to human H2N2 virus, which served as a control and largely caused mild pneumonia similar to seasonal influenza A viruses, the swine H2N3 virus was more pathogenic causing severe pneumonia in nonhuman primates. Both viruses replicated in the entire respiratory tract, but only swine H2N3 could be isolated from lung tissue on day 6 post infection. All animals cleared the infection whereas swine H2N3 infected macaques still presented with pathologic changes indicative of chronic pneumonia at day 14 post infection. Swine H2N3 virus was also detected to significantly higher titers in nasal and oral swabs indicating the potential for animal-to-animal transmission. Blood plasma levels of Interleukin 6 (IL-6), Interleukin 8, monocyte chemotactic protein-1 and Interferon-gamma were significantly increased in swine H2N3 compared to human H2N2 infected animals supporting the previously published notion of increased IL-6 levels being a potential marker for severe influenza infections. Researchers concluded the swine H2N3 virus represents a threat to humans with the potential for causing a larger outbreak in a non-immune or partially immune population. Furthermore, surveillance efforts in farmed pig populations need to become an integral part of any epidemic and pandemic influenza preparedness.

== See also ==
- Bird flu
- Dog flu
- Horse flu
- Human flu
- Swine flu
