= Swine influenza =

Infection caused by influenza viruses endemic to pig

- Other names: Pig influenza, swine flu, hog flu, pig flu
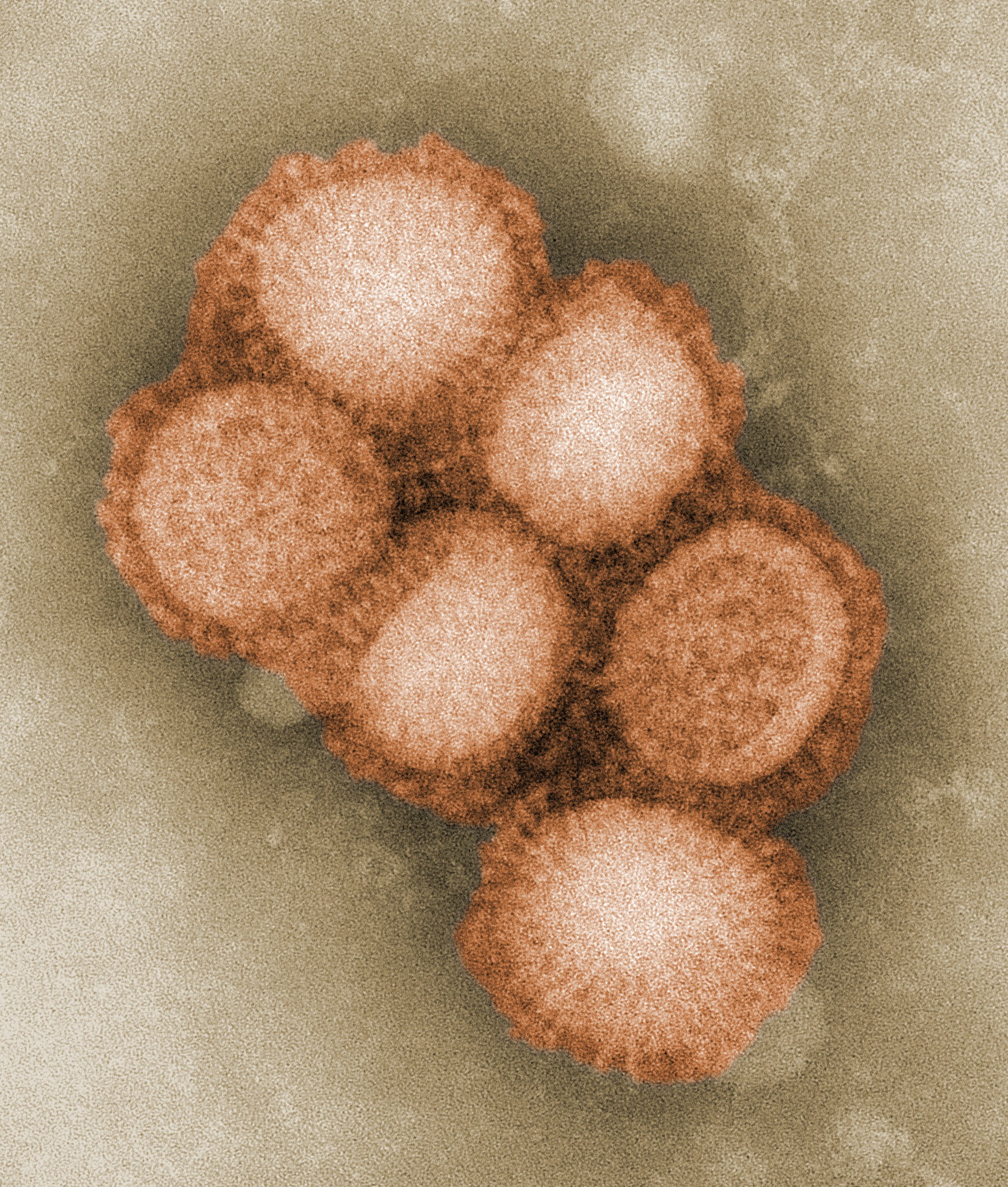
- Electron microscope image of the reassorted H1N1 influenza virus photographed at the CDC Influenza Laboratory. The viruses are 80–120 nanometres in diameter.
- Specialty: Infectious disease
- Symptoms: Coughing, sneezing, fever, lethargy, sore throat, body aches, cytokine storm (1918–1920), epistaxis (1918–1920),
- Complications: respiratory failure, bacterial pneumonia, hair loss (1918-1920)

Swine influenza is an infection caused by any of several types of swine influenza viruses. Swine influenza virus (SIV) or swine-origin influenza virus (S-OIV) refers to any strain of the influenza family of viruses that is endemic in pigs. As of 2009, identified SIV strains include influenza C and the subtypes of influenza A known as H1N1, H1N2, H2N1, H3N1, H3N2, and H2N3.

The swine influenza virus is common throughout pig populations worldwide. Transmission of the virus from pigs to humans is rare and does not always lead to human illness, often resulting only in the production of antibodies in the blood. If transmission causes human illness, it is called a zoonotic swine flu. People with regular exposure to pigs are at increased risk of swine flu infections.

Around the mid-20th century, the identification of influenza subtypes was made possible, allowing accurate diagnosis of transmission to humans. Since then, only 50 such transmissions have been confirmed. These strains of swine flu rarely pass from human to human. Symptoms of zoonotic swine flu in humans are similar to those of influenza and influenza-like illness and include chills, fever, sore throat, muscle pains, severe headache, coughing, weakness, shortness of breath, and general discomfort.

It is estimated that, in the 2009 flu pandemic, 11–21% of the then global population (of about 6.8 billion), equivalent to around 700 million to 1.4 billion people, contracted the illness—more, in absolute terms, than the Spanish flu pandemic. There were 18,449 confirmed fatalities. However, in a 2012 study, the CDC estimated more than 284,000 possible fatalities worldwide, with numbers ranging from 150,000 to 575,000. In August 2010, the World Health Organization declared the swine flu pandemic officially over.

Subsequent cases of swine flu were reported in India in 2015, with over 31,156 positive test cases and 1,841 deaths.

== Signs and symptoms ==
In pigs, a swine influenza infection produces fever, lethargy, discharge from the nose or eyes, sneezing, coughing, difficulty breathing, eye redness or inflammation, and decreased appetite. In some cases, the infection can cause miscarriage. However, infected pigs may not exhibit any symptoms. Although mortality is usually low (around 1–4%), the virus can cause weight loss and poor growth, in turn causing economic loss to farmers. Infected pigs can lose up to 12 pounds of body weight over a three- to four-week period. Influenza A is responsible for infecting swine and was first identified in 1918. Because both avian and mammalian influenza viruses can bind to receptors in pigs, pigs have often been seen as "mixing vessels", facilitating the evolution of strains that can be passed on to other mammals, such as humans.

=== Humans ===
Main symptoms of swine flu in humans

Direct transmission of a swine flu virus from pigs to humans is possible (zoonotic swine flu). Fifty cases are known to have occurred since the first report in medical literature in 1958, which have resulted in a total of six deaths. Of these six people, one was pregnant, one had leukemia, one had Hodgkin's lymphoma, and two were known to be previously healthy. No medical history was reported for the remaining case The true rate of infection may be higher, as most cases only cause a very mild disease and may never be reported or diagnosed.

In this video, Dr. Joe Bresee, with CDC's Influenza Division, describes the symptoms of swine flu and warning signs to look for that indicate the need for urgent medical attention. See also: See this video with subtitles on YouTube

According to the United States Centers for Disease Control and Prevention (CDC), in humans the symptoms of the 2009 "swine flu" H1N1 virus are similar to influenza and influenza-like illness. Symptoms include fever, cough, sore throat, watery eyes, body aches, shortness of breath, headache, weight loss, chills, sneezing, runny nose, coughing, dizziness, abdominal pain, lack of appetite, and fatigue. During the 2009 outbreak, an elevated percentage of patients reporting diarrhea and vomiting.

Because these symptoms are not specific to swine flu, a differential diagnosis of probable swine flu requires not only symptoms, but also a high likelihood of swine flu due to the person's recent and past medical history. For example, during the 2009 swine flu outbreak in the United States, the CDC advised physicians to "consider swine influenza infection in the differential diagnosis of patients with acute febrile respiratory illness who have either been in contact with persons with confirmed swine flu, or who were in one of the five U.S. states that have reported swine flu cases or in Mexico during the seven days preceding their illness onset." A diagnosis of confirmed swine flu requires laboratory testing of a respiratory sample (a simple nose and throat swab).

The most common cause of death is respiratory failure. Other causes of death are pneumonia (leading to sepsis), high fever (leading to neurological problems), dehydration (from excessive vomiting and diarrhea), electrolyte imbalance and kidney failure. Fatalities are more likely in young children and the elderly.

== Virology ==
=== Transmission ===
==== Between pigs ====
Influenza is common in pigs. About half of breeding pigs in the USA have been exposed to the virus. Antibodies to the virus are also common in pigs in other countries.

The main route of transmission is through direct contact between infected and uninfected animals. These close contacts are particularly common during animal transport. Intensive farming may also increase the risk of transmission, as the pigs are raised in very close proximity to each other. Direct transfer of the virus probably occurs though pigs touching noses or through dried mucus. Airborne transmission through the aerosols produced by pigs coughing or sneezing are also an important means of infection. The virus usually spreads quickly through a herd, infecting all the pigs within just a few days. Transmission may also occur through wild animals, such as wild boar, which can spread the disease between farms.

==== To humans ====
People who work with poultry and swine, especially those with intense exposures, are at increased risk of zoonotic infection with influenza virus endemic in these animals, and constitute a population of human hosts in which zoonosis and reassortment can co-occur. Vaccination of these workers against influenza and surveillance for new influenza strains among this population may therefore be an important public health measure. Transmission of influenza from swine to humans who work with swine was documented in a small surveillance study performed in 2004 at the University of Iowa. This study, among others, forms the basis of a recommendation that people whose jobs involve handling poultry and swine be the focus of increased public health surveillance. Other professions at particular risk of infection are veterinarians and meat processing workers, although the risk of infection for both of these groups is lower than that of farm workers.

==== Interaction with avian H5N1 in pigs ====
Pigs are unusual because they can be infected with influenza strains that usually infect three different species: pigs, birds, and humans. Within pigs, influenza viruses may exchange genes and produce novel strains. Avian influenza virus H3N2 is endemic in pigs in China and has been detected in pigs in Vietnam, increasing fears of the emergence of new variant strains. H3N2 evolved from H2N2 by antigenic shift. In August 2004, researchers in China found H5N1 in pigs.

These H5N1 infections may be common. In a survey of 10 apparently healthy pigs housed near poultry farms in West Java, where avian flu had broken out, five of the pig samples contained the H5N1 virus. The Indonesian government found similar results in the same region, though additional tests of 150 pigs outside the area were negative.

=== Structure ===
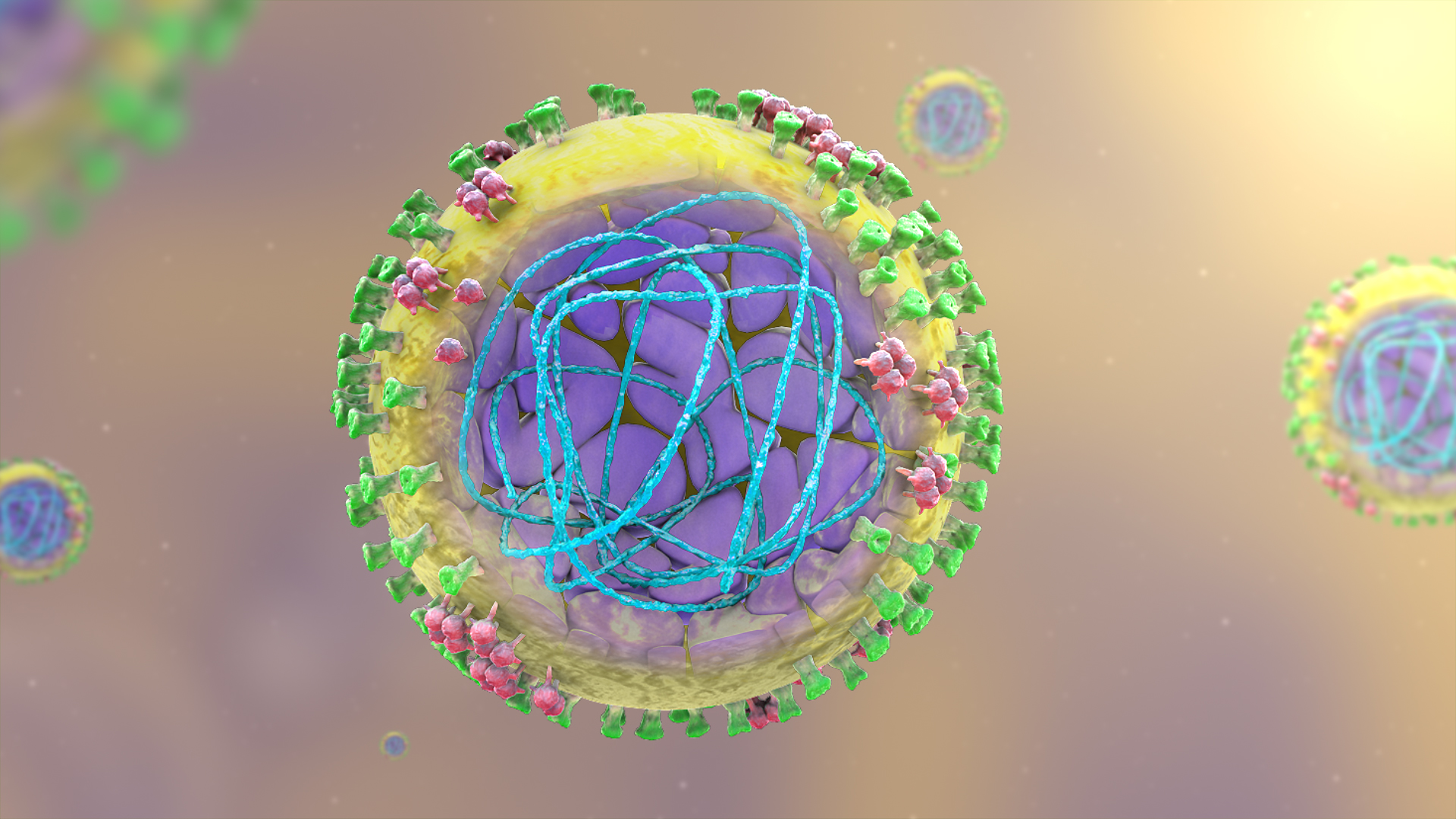
Structure of H1N1 Virion.

Main symptoms of swine flu in swine

The influenza virion is roughly spherical. It is an enveloped virus; the outer layer is a lipid membrane which is taken from the host cell in which the virus multiplies. Inserted into the lipid membrane are glycoprotein "spikes" of hemagglutinin (HA) and neuraminidase (NA). The combination of HA and NA proteins determine the subtype of influenza virus (A/H1N1, for example). HA and NA are important in the immune response against the virus, and antibodies against these spikes may protect against infection. The antiviral drugs Relenza and Tamiflu target NA by inhibiting neuraminidase and preventing the release of viruses from host cells. Also embedded in the lipid membrane is the M2 protein, which is the target of the antiviral adamantanes amantadine and rimantadine.

==== Classification ====
Of the three genera of influenza viruses that cause human flu, two also cause influenza in pigs, with influenza A being common in pigs and influenza C being rare. Influenza B has not been reported in pigs. Within influenza A and influenza C, the strains found in pigs and humans are largely distinct, although because of reassortment there have been transfers of genes among strains crossing swine, avian, and human species boundaries.

==== Influenza C ====
Influenza viruses infect both humans and pigs, but do not infect birds. Transmission between pigs and humans have occurred in the past. For example, influenza C caused small outbreaks of a mild form of influenza amongst children in Japan and California. As a result of the limited host range and lack of genetic diversity in influenza C, this form of influenza does not cause pandemics in humans.

==== Influenza A ====
Swine influenza is caused by influenza A subtypes H1N1, H1N2, H2N3, H3N1, and H3N2. In pigs, four influenza A virus subtypes (H1N1, H1N2, H3N2 and H7N9) are the most common strains worldwide. In the United States, the H1N1 subtype was exclusively prevalent among swine populations before 1998. Since late August 1998, H3N2 subtypes have been isolated from pigs. As of 2004, H3N2 virus isolates in US swine and turkey stocks were triple reassortants, containing genes from human (HA, NA, and PB1), swine (NS, NP, and M), and avian (PB2 and PA) lineages. In August 2012, the Center for Disease Control and Prevention confirmed 145 human cases (113 in Indiana, 30 in Ohio, one in Hawaii and one in Illinois) of H3N2v since July 2012. The death of a 61-year-old Madison County, Ohio woman is the first in the USA associated with a new swine flu strain. She contracted the illness after having contact with hogs at the Ross County Fair.

== Diagnosis ==
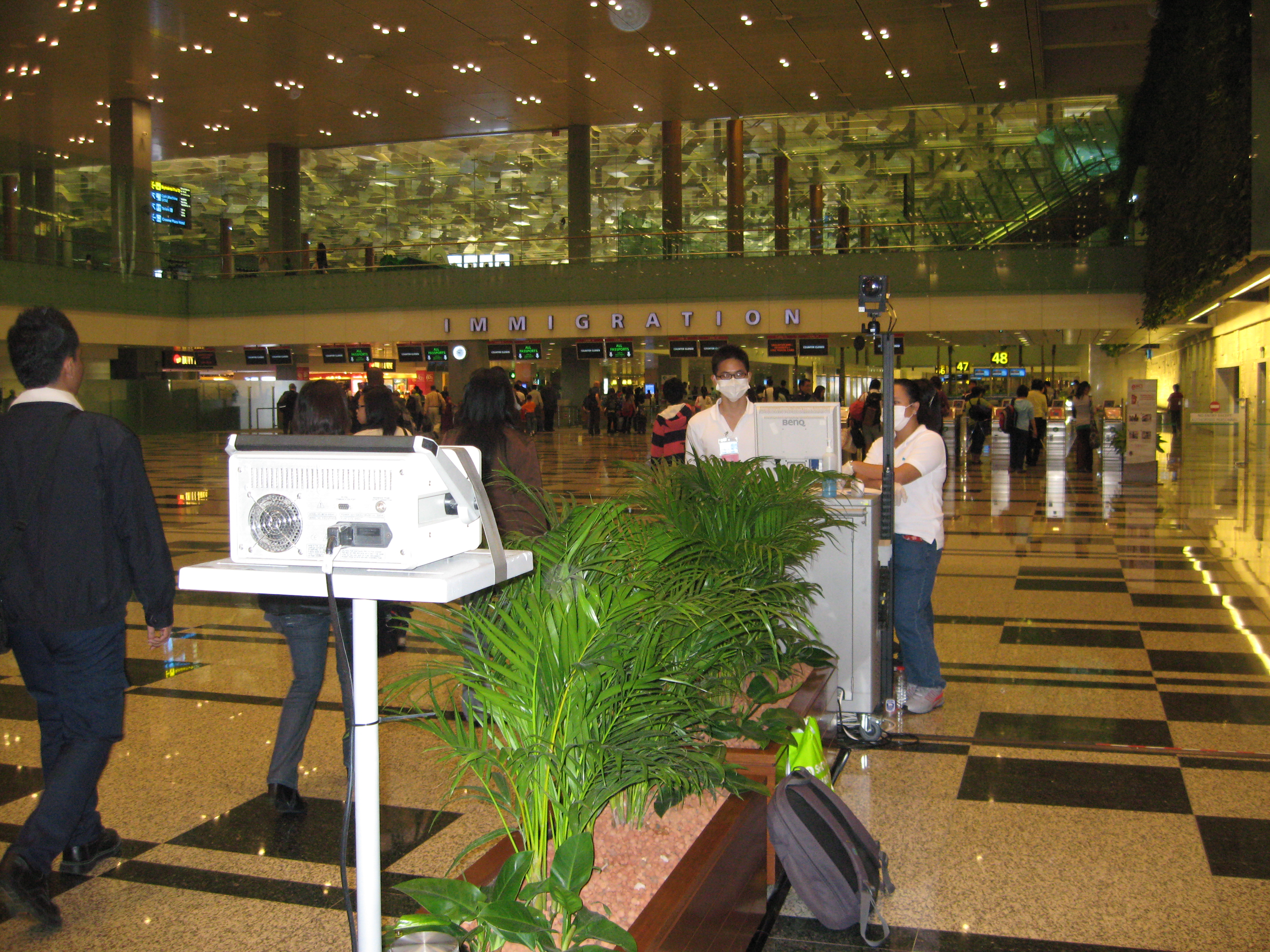
Thermal scanning of passengers arriving at Singapore Changi airport

The CDC recommends real-time PCR as the method of choice for diagnosing H1N1. The oral or nasal fluid collection and RNA virus-preserving filter-paper card is commercially available. This method allows a specific diagnosis of novel influenza (H1N1) as opposed to seasonal influenza. Near-patient point-of-care tests are in development.

== Prevention ==
Prevention of swine influenza has three components: prevention in pigs, prevention of transmission to humans, and prevention of its spread among humans. Proper handwashing techniques can prevent the virus from spreading. Individuals can prevent infection by not touching the eyes, nose, or mouth, distancing from others who display symptoms of the cold or flu, and avoiding contact with others when displaying symptoms.

=== Swine ===
Methods of preventing the spread of influenza among swine include facility management, herd management, and vaccination (ATCvet code: QI09AA03 (WHO)). Because much of the illness and death associated with swine flu involves secondary infection by other pathogens, control strategies that rely on vaccination may be insufficient.

Control of swine influenza by vaccination has become more difficult in recent decades, as the evolution of the virus has resulted in inconsistent responses to traditional vaccines. Standard commercial swine flu vaccines are effective in controlling the infection when the virus strains match enough to have significant cross-protection, and custom (autogenous) vaccines made from the specific viruses isolated are created and used in the more difficult cases. Present vaccination strategies for SIV control and prevention in swine farms typically include the use of one of several bivalent SIV vaccines commercially available in the United States. Of the 97 recent H3N2 isolates examined, only 41 isolates had strong serologic cross-reactions with antiserum to three commercial SIV vaccines. Since the protective ability of influenza vaccines depends primarily on the closeness of the match between the vaccine virus and the epidemic virus, the presence of nonreactive H3N2 SIV variants suggests current commercial vaccines might not effectively protect pigs from infection with a majority of H3N2 viruses. The United States Department of Agriculture researchers say while pig vaccination keeps pigs from getting sick, it does not block infection or shedding of the virus.

Facility management includes using disinfectants and ambient temperature to control viruses in the environment. They are unlikely to survive outside living cells for more than two weeks, except in cold (but above freezing) conditions, and are readily inactivated by disinfectants. Herd management includes not adding pigs carrying influenza to herds that have not been exposed to the virus. The virus survives in healthy carrier pigs for up to three months and can be recovered from them between outbreaks. Carrier pigs are usually responsible for the introduction of SIV into previously uninfected herds and countries, so new animals should be quarantined. After an outbreak, as immunity in exposed pigs wanes, new outbreaks of the same strain can occur.

=== Humans ===
Prevention of pig-to-human transmission

Swine can be infected by both avian and human flu strains of influenza, and therefore are hosts where the antigenic shifts can occur that create new influenza strains.

The transmission from swine to humans is believed to occur mainly in swine farms, where farmers are in close contact with live pigs. Although strains of swine influenza are usually not able to infect humans, it may occasionally happen, so farmers and veterinarians are encouraged to use face masks when dealing with infected animals. The use of vaccines on swine to prevent their infection is a major method of limiting swine-to-human transmission. Risk factors that may contribute to the swine-to-human transmission include smoking and, especially, not wearing gloves when working with sick animals, thereby increasing the likelihood of subsequent hand-to-eye, hand-to-nose, or hand-to-mouth transmission.

Prevention of human-to-human transmission

Influenza spreads between humans when infected people cough or sneeze, then other people breathe in the virus or touch something with the virus on it and then touch their own face. The CDC warned against touching mucosal membranes such as the eyes, nose, or mouth during the 2009 H1N1 pandemic, as these are common entry points for flu viruses. Swine flu cannot be spread by pork products, since the virus is not transmitted through food. The swine flu in humans is most contagious during the first five days of the illness, although some people, most commonly children, can remain contagious for up to ten days. Diagnosis can be made by sending a specimen, collected during the first five days, for analysis.

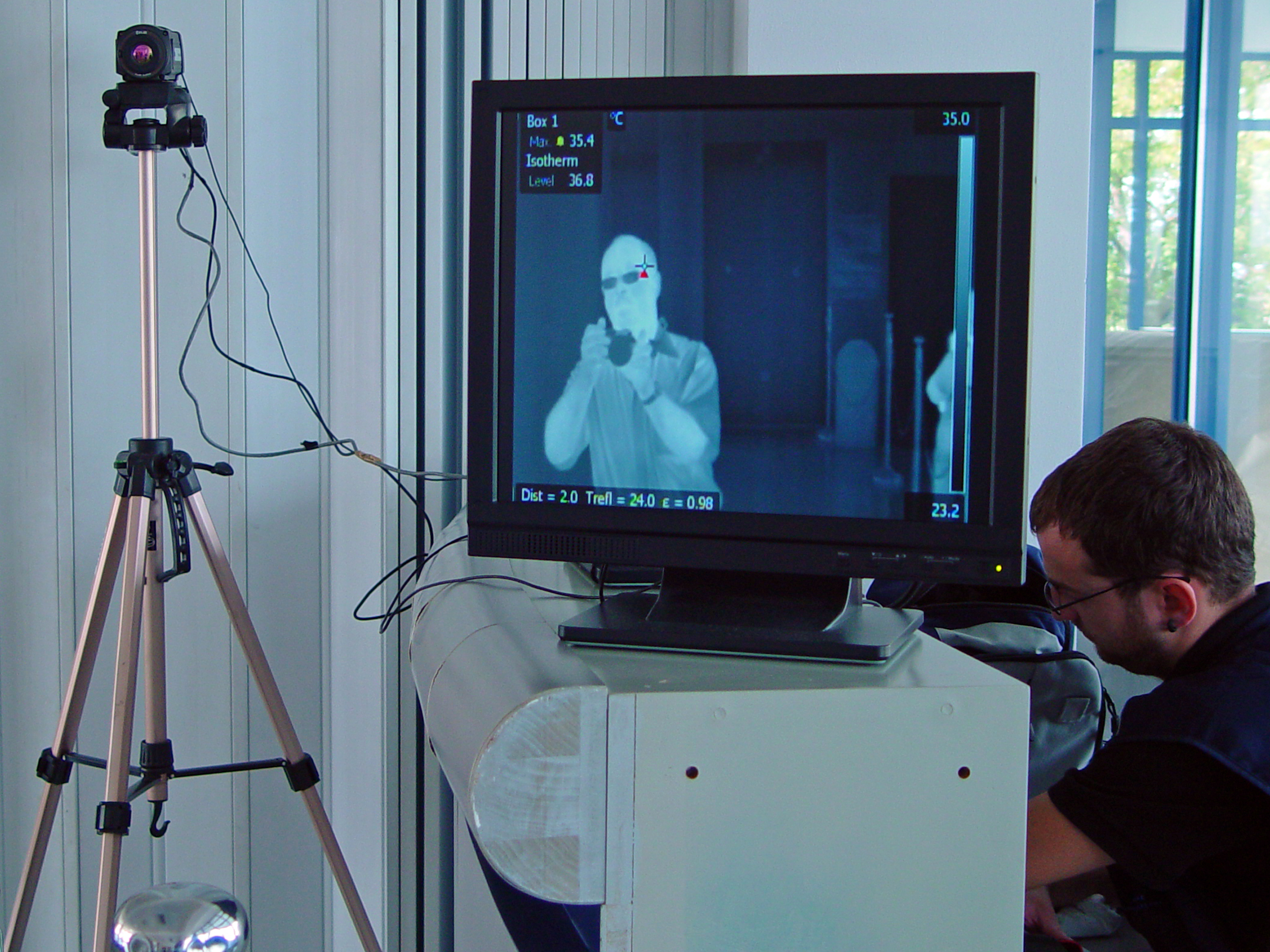
Thermal imaging camera and screen, photographed in an airport terminal in Greece – thermal imaging can detect elevated body temperature, one of the signs of the virus H1N1 (swine influenza).

Recommendations to prevent the spread of the virus among humans include using standard infection control, which includes frequent washing of hands with soap and water or with alcohol-based hand sanitizers, especially after being out in public. Chance of transmission is also reduced by disinfecting household surfaces, which can be done effectively with a diluted chlorine bleach solution.

Influenza can spread in coughs or sneezes, but an increasing body of evidence shows small droplets containing the virus can linger on tabletops, telephones, and other surfaces and be transferred via the fingers to the eyes, nose, or mouth. Alcohol-based gel or foam hand sanitizers work well to destroy viruses and bacteria. Anyone with flu-like symptoms, such as a sudden fever, cough, or muscle aches, should stay away from work or public transportation and should contact a doctor for advice.

Social distancing can be another infection control tactic. Individuals should avoid other people who might be infected or if infected themselves isolate from others for the duration of the infection. During active outbreaks, avoiding large gatherings, increasing physical distance in public places, or if possible remaining at home as much as is feasible can prevent further spread of disease. Public health and other responsible authorities have action plans which may request or require social distancing actions, depending on the severity of the outbreak.

==== Vaccination ====
Vaccines are available for different kinds of swine flu. The U.S. Food and Drug Administration (FDA) approved the new swine flu vaccine for use in the United States on September 15, 2009. Studies by the National Institutes of Health show a single dose creates enough antibodies to protect against the virus within about 10 days.

In the aftermath of the 2009 pandemic, several studies were conducted to see which population groups were most likely to have received an influenza vaccine. These studies demonstrated that caucasians are much more likely to be vaccinated for seasonal influenza and for the H1N1 strain than African Americans. This could be due to several factors. Historically, there has been mistrust of vaccines and of the medical community from African Americans. Many African Americans do not believe vaccines or doctors to be effective. This mistrust stems from the exploitation of the African American communities during studies like the Tuskegee study. Additionally, vaccines are typically administered in clinics, hospitals, or doctor's offices. Many people of lower socioeconomic status are less likely to receive vaccinations because they do not have health insurance.

=== Surveillance ===
Although there is no formal national surveillance system in the United States to determine what viruses are circulating in pigs, an informal surveillance network in the United States is part of a world surveillance network.

== Treatment ==
=== Swine ===
As swine influenza is rarely fatal to pigs, little treatment beyond rest and supportive care is required. Instead, veterinary efforts are focused on preventing the spread of the virus throughout the farm or to other farms. Vaccination and animal management techniques are most important in these efforts. Antibiotics are also used to treat the disease, which, although they have no effect against the influenza virus, do help prevent bacterial pneumonia and other secondary infections in influenza-weakened herds.

In Europe the avian-like H1N1 and the human-like H3N2 and H1N2 are the most common influenza subtypes in swine, of which avian-like H1N1 is the most frequent. Since 2009 another subtype, pdmH1N1(2009), emerged globally and also in European pig population. The prevalence varies from country to country but all of the subtypes are continuously circulating in swine herds. In the EU region whole-virus vaccines are available which are inactivated and adjuvanted. Vaccination of sows is common practice and reveals also a benefit to young pigs by prolonging the maternally level of antibodies. Several commercial vaccines are available including a trivalent one being used in sow vaccination and a vaccine against pdmH1N1(2009). In vaccinated sows multiplication of viruses and virus shedding are significantly reduced.

=== Humans ===
If a human becomes sick with swine flu, antiviral drugs can make the illness milder and make the patient feel better faster. They may also prevent serious flu complications. For treatment, antiviral drugs work best if started soon after getting sick (within two days of symptoms). Beside antivirals, supportive care at home or in a hospital focuses on controlling fevers, relieving pain and maintaining fluid balance, as well as identifying and treating any secondary infections or other medical problems. The U.S. Centers for Disease Control and Prevention recommends the use of oseltamivir (Tamiflu) or zanamivir (Relenza) for the treatment and/or prevention of infection with swine influenza viruses; however, the majority of people infected with the virus make a full recovery without requiring medical attention or antiviral drugs. The virus isolated in the 2009 outbreak have been found resistant to amantadine and rimantadine.

== History ==
=== Pandemics ===
Swine influenza was first proposed to be a disease related to human flu during the 1918 flu pandemic, when pigs became ill at the same time as humans. The first identification of an influenza virus as a cause of disease in pigs occurred about ten years later, in 1930. For the following 60 years, swine influenza strains were almost exclusively H1N1. Then, between 1997 and 2002, new strains of three different subtypes and five different genotypes emerged as causes of influenza among pigs in North America. In 1997–1998, H3N2 strains emerged. These strains, which include genes derived by reassortment from human, swine and avian viruses, have become a major cause of swine influenza in North America. Reassortment between H1N1 and H3N2 produced H1N2. In 1999 in Canada, a strain of H4N6 crossed the species barrier from birds to pigs, but was contained on a single farm.

The H1N1 form of swine flu is one of the descendants of the strain that caused the 1918 flu pandemic. As well as persisting in pigs, the descendants of the 1918 virus have also circulated in humans through the 20th century, contributing to the normal seasonal epidemics of influenza. However, direct transmission from pigs to humans is rare, with only 12 recorded cases in the U.S. since 2005. Nevertheless, the retention of influenza strains in pigs after these strains have disappeared from the human population might make pigs a reservoir where influenza viruses could persist, later emerging to reinfect humans once human immunity to these strains has waned.

Swine flu has been reported numerous times as a zoonosis in humans, usually with limited distribution, rarely with a widespread distribution. Outbreaks in swine are common and cause significant economic losses in industry, primarily by causing stunting and extended time to market. For example, this disease costs the British meat industry about £65 million every year.

==== 1918 ====
The 1918 flu pandemic in humans was associated with H1N1 and influenza appearing in pigs; this may reflect a zoonosis either from swine to humans, or from humans to swine. Although it is not certain in which direction the virus was transferred, some evidence suggests that in this case pigs caught the disease from humans. For instance, swine influenza was only noted as a new disease of pigs in 1918 after the first large outbreaks of influenza amongst people. Although a recent phylogenetic analysis of more recent strains of influenza in humans, birds, and other animals including swine suggests the 1918 outbreak in humans followed a reassortment event within a mammal, the exact origin of the 1918 strain remains elusive. It is estimated that anywhere from 50 to 100 million people were killed worldwide.

==== U.S. 2009 ====
The swine flu was initially seen in the US in April 2009, where the strain of the particular virus was a mixture from 3 types of strains. Six of the genes are very similar to the H1N2 influenza virus that was found in pigs around 2000.

=== Outbreaks ===
==== 1976 U.S. ====
On February 5, 1976, a United States army recruit at Fort Dix said he felt tired and weak. He died the next day, and four of his fellow soldiers were later hospitalized. Two weeks after his death, health officials announced the cause of death was a new strain of swine flu. The strain, a variant of H1N1, is known as A/New Jersey/1976 (H1N1). It was detected only from January 19 to February 9 and did not spread beyond Fort Dix.

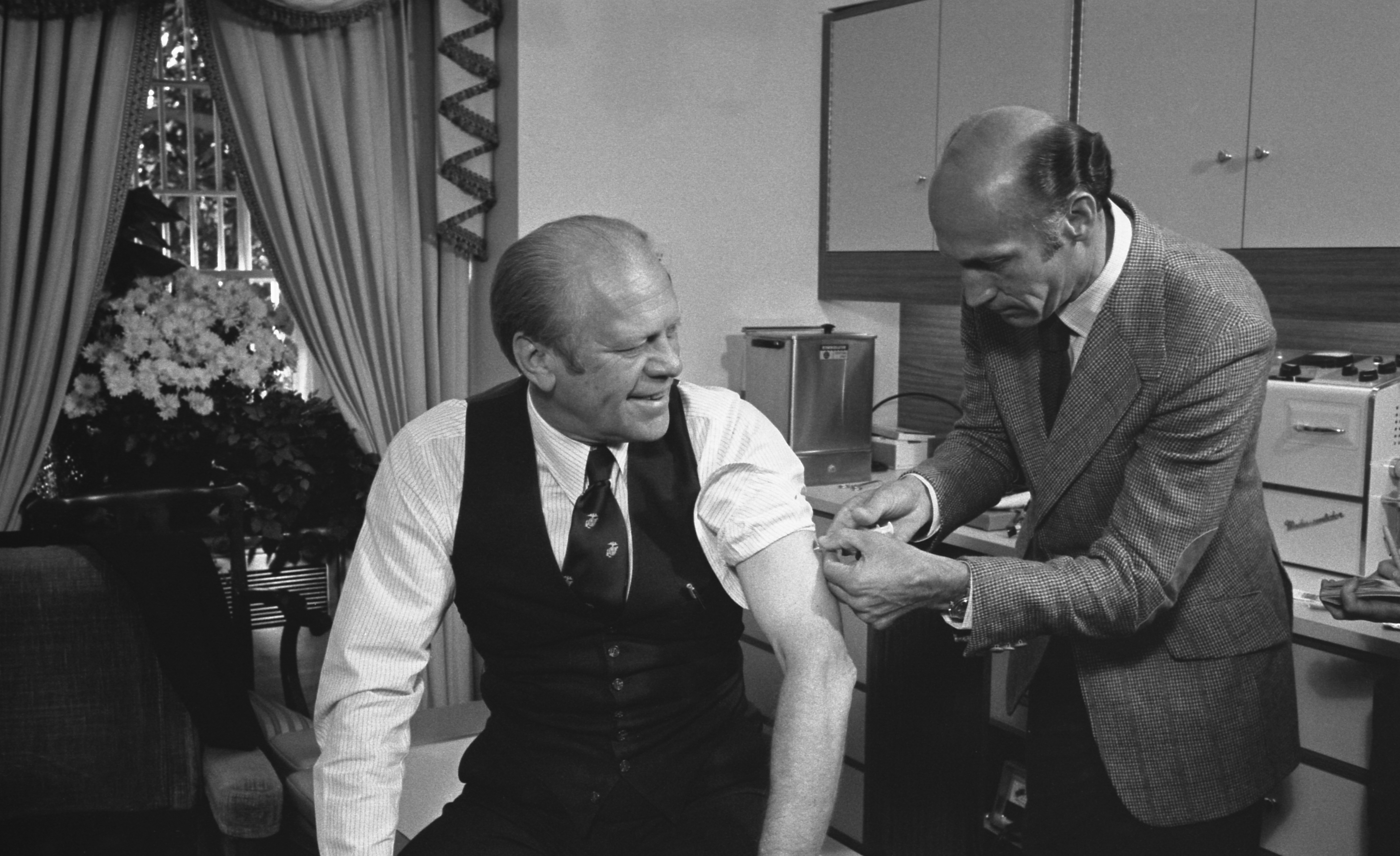
U.S. President Gerald Ford receives a swine flu vaccination

This new strain appeared to be closely related to the strain involved in the 1918 flu pandemic. Moreover, the ensuing increased surveillance uncovered another strain in circulation in the U.S.: A/Victoria/75 (H3N2), which spread simultaneously, also caused illness, and persisted until March. Alarmed public health officials decided action must be taken to head off another major pandemic, and urged President Gerald Ford that every person in the U.S. be vaccinated for the disease.

The vaccination program was plagued by delays and public relations problems. On October 1, 1976, immunizations began, and three senior citizens died soon after receiving their injections. This resulted in a media outcry that linked these deaths to the immunizations, despite the lack of any proof the vaccine was the cause. According to science writer Patrick Di Justo, however, by the time the truth was known—that the deaths were not proven to be related to the vaccine—it was too late. "The government had long feared mass panic about swine flu—now they feared mass panic about the swine flu vaccinations." This became a strong setback to the program.

There were reports of Guillain–Barré syndrome (GBS), a paralyzing neuromuscular disorder, affecting some people who had received swine flu immunizations. Although whether a link exists is still not clear, this syndrome may be a side effect of influenza vaccines. As a result, Di Justo writes, "the public refused to trust a government-operated health program that killed old people and crippled young people." In total, 48,161,019 Americans, or just over 22% of the population, had been immunized by the time the National Influenza Immunization Program was effectively halted on December 16, 1976.

Overall, there were 1098 cases of GBS recorded nationwide by CDC surveillance, 532 of which occurred after vaccination and 543 before vaccination. About one to two cases per 100,000 people of GBS occur every year, whether or not people have been vaccinated. The vaccination program seems to have increased this normal risk of developing GBS by about to one extra case per 100,000 vaccinations.

Recompensation charges were filed for over 4,000 cases of severe vaccination damage, including 25 deaths, totaling US$3.5 billion, by 1979. The CDC stated most studies on modern influenza vaccines have seen no link with GBS, Although one review gives an incidence of about one case per million vaccinations, a large study in China, reported in the New England Journal of Medicine, covering close to 100 million doses of H1N1 flu vaccine, found only 11 cases of GBS, which is lower than the normal rate of the disease in China: "The risk-benefit ratio, which is what vaccines and everything in medicine is about, is overwhelmingly in favor of vaccination."

==== 1988 U.S. ====
In September 1988, a swine flu virus killed one woman and infected others. A 32-year-old woman, Barbara Ann Wieners, was eight months pregnant when she and her husband, Ed, became ill after visiting the hog barn at a county fair in Walworth County, Wisconsin. Barbara died eight days later, after developing pneumonia. The only pathogen identified was an H1N1 strain of swine influenza virus. Doctors were able to induce labor and deliver a healthy daughter before she died. Her husband recovered from his symptoms.

Influenza-like illness (ILI) was reportedly widespread among the pigs exhibited at the fair. Of the 25 swine exhibitors aged 9 to 19 at the fair, 19 tested positive for antibodies to SIV, but no serious illnesses were seen. The virus was able to spread between people, since one to three health care personnel who had cared for the pregnant woman developed mild, influenza-like illnesses, and antibody tests suggested they had been infected with swine flu, but there was no community outbreak.

In 1998, swine flu was found in pigs in four U.S. states. Within a year, it had spread through pig populations across the United States. Scientists found this virus had originated in pigs as a recombinant form of flu strains from birds and humans. This outbreak confirmed that pigs can serve as a crucible where novel influenza viruses emerge as a result of the reassortment of genes from different strains. Genetic components of these 1998 triple-hybrid strains would later form six out of the eight viral gene segments in the 2009 flu outbreak.

==== 2007 Philippines ====
On August 20, 2007, Department of Agriculture officers investigated the outbreak of swine flu in Nueva Ecija and central Luzon, Philippines. The mortality rate is less than 10% for swine flu, unless there are complications like hog cholera. On July 27, 2007, the Philippine National Meat Inspection Service (NMIS) raised a hog cholera "red alert" warning over Metro Manila and five regions of Luzon after the disease spread to backyard pig farms in Bulacan and Pampanga, even if they tested negative for the swine flu virus.

==== 2009 Northern Ireland ====
Since November 2009, 14 deaths as a result of swine flu in Northern Ireland have been reported. The majority of the deceased were reported to have pre-existing health conditions which had lowered their immunity. This closely corresponds to the 19 patients who had died in the year prior due to swine flu, where 18 of the 19 were determined to have lowered immune systems. Because of this, many mothers who have just given birth are strongly encouraged to get a flu shot because their immune systems are vulnerable. Also, studies have shown that people between the ages of 15 and 44 have the highest rate of infection. Although most people now recover, having any conditions that lower one's immune system increases the risk of having the flu become potentially lethal. In Northern Ireland now, approximately 56% of all people under 65 who are entitled to the vaccine have gotten the shot, and the outbreak is said to be under control.

==== 2015 and 2019 India ====
Swine flu outbreaks were reported in India in late 2014 and early 2015. As of March 19, 2015 the disease has affected 31,151 people and claimed over 1,841 lives. The largest number of reported cases and deaths due to the disease occurred in the western part of India including states like Delhi, Madhya Pradesh, Rajasthan, and Gujarat Andhra Pradesh Researchers of MIT have claimed that the swine flu has mutated in India to a more virulent version with changes in Hemagglutinin protein, contradicting earlier research by Indian researchers.

There was another outbreak in India in 2017. The states of Maharashtra and Gujarat were the worst affected. Gujarat high court has given Gujarat government instructions to control deaths by swine flu. 1,090 people died of swine flu in India in 2019 until August 31, 2019.

==== 2015 Nepal ====
Swine flu outbreaks were reported in Nepal in the spring of 2015. Up to April 21, 2015, the disease had claimed 26 lives in the most severely affected district, Jajarkot in Northwest Nepal. Cases were also detected in the districts of Kathmandu, Morang, Kaski, and Chitwan. As of 22 April 2015 the Nepal Ministry of Health reported that 2,498 people had been treated in Jajarkot, of whom 552 were believed to have swine flu, and acknowledged that the government's response had been inadequate. The Jajarkot outbreak had just been declared an emergency when the April 2015 Nepal earthquake struck on 25 April 2015, diverting all medical and emergency resources to quake-related rescue and recovery.

==== 2016 Pakistan ====
Seven cases of swine flu were reported in Punjab province of Pakistan, mainly in the city of Multan, in January 2017. Cases of swine flu were also reported in Lahore and Faisalabad.

==== 2017 Maldives ====
As of March 16, 2017, over a hundred confirmed cases of swine flu and at least six deaths were reported in the Maldivian capital of Malé and some other islands. Makeshift flu clinics were opened in Malé. Schools in the capital were closed, prison visitations suspended, several events cancelled, and all non-essential travel to other islands outside the capital was advised against by the HPA. An influenza vaccination program focusing on pregnant women was initiated thereafter. An official visit by Saudi King Salman bin Abdulaziz Al Saud to the Maldives during his Asian tour was also cancelled last minute amidst fears over the outbreak of swine flu.

=== 2020 G4 EA H1N1 publication ===
G4 EA H1N1, also known as the G4 swine flu virus (G4) is a swine influenza virus strain discovered in China. The virus is a variant genotype 4 (G4) Eurasian avian-like (EA) H1N1 virus that mainly affects pigs, but there is some evidence of it infecting people. A peer-reviewed paper from the Proceedings of the National Academy of Sciences (PNAS) stated that "G4 EA H1N1 viruses possess all the essential hallmarks of being highly adapted to infect humans ... Controlling the prevailing G4 EA H1N1 viruses in pigs and close monitoring of swine working populations should be promptly implemented."

Michael Ryan, executive director of the World Health Organization (WHO) Health Emergencies Program, stated in July 2020 that this strain of influenza virus was not new and had been under surveillance since 2011. Almost 30,000 swine had been monitored via nasal swabs between 2011 and 2018. While other variants of the virus have appeared and diminished, the study claimed the G4 variant has sharply increased since 2016 to become the predominant strain. The Chinese Ministry of Agriculture and Rural Affairs rebutted the study, saying that the media had interpreted the study "in an exaggerated and nonfactual way" and that the number of pigs sampled was too small to demonstrate G4 had become the dominant strain.

Between 2016 and 2018, a serum surveillance program screened 338 swine production workers in China for exposure (presence of antibodies) to G4 EA H1N1 and found 35 (10.4%) positive. Among another 230 people screened who did not work in the swine industry, 10 (4.4%) were serum positive for antibodies indicating exposure. Two cases of infection caused by the G4 variant have been documented as of July 2020, with no confirmed cases of human-to-human transmission.

Health officials (including Anthony Fauci) say the virus should be monitored, particularly among those in close contact with pigs, but it is not an immediate threat. There are no reported cases or evidence of the virus outside of China as of July 2020.

== See also ==
- COVID-19 pandemic
- Risk assessment for organic swine health
