= 60S ribosomal protein L10 =

Protein found in humans

RPL10

Identifiers
- Aliases: RPL10, AUTSX5, DXS648, DXS648E, L10, NOV, QM, ribosomal protein L10, MRXS35
- External IDs: OMIM: 312173; MGI: 105943; GeneCards: RPL10
Available structures
PDB	Ortholog search: PDBe RCSB
PDB	List of PDB id codes 2PA2, 5AJ0, 4UJD, 4D67, 4D5Y, 4UJE, 4UJC

Gene location (Human)
Chr.	X chromosome (human)
Band	Xq28	Start	154,389,955 bp
Band	Xq28	End	154,409,168 bp

Gene location (Mouse)
Chr.	X chromosome (mouse)
Band	X A7.3|X 37.94 cM	Start	73,314,418 bp
Band	X A7.3|X 37.94 cM	End	73,316,741 bp
RNA expression pattern
Bgee	Human / Mouse (ortholog); Top expressed in: left ovary; ganglionic eminence; right ovary; canal of the cervix; body of uterus; ventricular zone; right uterine tube; granulocyte; left uterine tube; ectocervix / Top expressed in: epiblast; lens; embryo; embryo; esophagus; ileum; ganglionic eminence; ventricular zone; jejunum; quadriceps femoris muscle; More reference expression data
BioGPS	n/a
Gene ontology
Molecular function	protein binding; RNA binding; structural constituent of ribosome; translation regulator activity
Cellular component	cytosol; ribosome; membrane; intracellular anatomical structure; endoplasmic reticulum; cytosolic large ribosomal subunit; nucleus; smooth endoplasmic reticulum; protein-containing complex
Biological process	viral transcription; SRP-dependent cotranslational protein targeting to membrane; ribosomal large subunit assembly; translational initiation; nuclear-transcribed mRNA catabolic process, nonsense-mediated decay; protein biosynthesis; rRNA processing; negative regulation of transcription by RNA polymerase II; negative regulation of apoptotic process; regulation of translation; embryonic brain development; multicellular organism development
Sources:Amigo / QuickGO
Orthologs
Databases	NCBI: entry; OMA: entry
Species	Human	Mouse
Entrez	6134	110954
Ensembl	ENSG00000147403	ENSMUSG00000008682
UniProt	P27635	Q6ZWV3
RefSeq (mRNA)	NM_006013; NM_001256577; NM_001256580; NM_001303624; NM_001303625 NM_001303626	NM_052835
RefSeq (protein)	NP_001243506; NP_001243509; NP_001290553; NP_001290554; NP_001290555 NP_006004	NP_443067
Location (UCSC)	Chr X: 154.39 – 154.41 Mb	Chr X: 73.31 – 73.32 Mb
PubMed search
- Wikidata
View/Edit Human	View/Edit Mouse

60S ribosomal protein L10 is a protein that in humans is encoded by the RPL10 gene.

== Function ==
Ribosomes, the organelles that catalyze protein synthesis, consist of a small 40S subunit and a large 60S subunit. Together, these subunits are composed of 4 RNA species and approximately 80 structurally distinct proteins. This gene encodes a ribosomal protein that is a component of the 60S subunit. The protein belongs to the L10E family of ribosomal proteins. It is located in the cytoplasm. In vitro, studies have shown that the chicken protein can bind to c-Jun and can repress c-Jun-mediated transcriptional activation, but these activities have not been demonstrated in vivo. This gene was initially identified as a candidate for a Wilms tumor suppressor gene, but later studies determined that this gene is not involved in the suppression of Wilms tumor. This gene has been referred to as 'laminin receptor homolog' because a chimeric transcript consisting of sequence from this gene and sequence from the laminin receptor gene was isolated; however, it is not believed that this gene encodes a laminin receptor. Transcript variants utilizing alternative polyA signals exist. The variant with the longest 3' UTR overlaps the deoxyribonuclease I-like 1 gene on the opposite strand. This gene is co-transcribed with the small nucleolar RNA gene U70, which is located in its fifth intron. As is typical for genes encoding ribosomal proteins, there are multiple processed pseudogenes of this gene dispersed through the genome.

== Interactions ==
RPL10 has been shown to interact with YES1.
