= German submarine U-65 =

U-65 may refer to one of the following German submarines:

- SM U-65, a German Type U 63 submarine
  - During the First World War, Germany also had these submarines with similar names:
    - SM UB-65, a German Type UB III submarine
    - SM UC-65, a German Type UC II submarine
- German submarine U-65 (1940), a German Type IXB submarine
