= German submarine U-70 =

U-70 may refer to one of the following German submarines:

- SM U-70, a Type U 66 submarine launched in 1915 and that served in the First World War until surrendered on 20 November 1918; broken up at Bo'ness in 1920–21
  - During the First World War, Germany also had these submarines with similar names:
    - SM UB-70, a Type UB III submarine launched in 1917 and disappeared after 5 May 1918
    - SM UC-70, a Type UC II submarine launched in 1916 and sunk on 28 August 1918
- German submarine U-70 (1940), a Type VIIC submarine that served in the Second World War until sunk on 7 March 1941
