= Risk assessment for organic swine health =

Risk assessment for organic swine health is the process of evaluating the likelihood and potential impact of various factors that may affect the health and well-being of organic swine. Risks associated with organic swine farming may differ to those associated with non-organic swine farming, and is of increasing relevance due to growth in the sector. While organic swine farming makes up a small share of U.S. swine farming overall, numbers have increased significantly in recent years. Additionally, non-certified organic swine herds are not accounted in official statistics. Consumer demand, stemming from the larger organic agriculture movement has helped spur growth in this industry.

== Organic swine production prerequisites ==
- Animals for slaughter must be raised under organic management from the last third of gestation. Producers are required to feed livestock agricultural feed products that are 100% organic, but may also provide allowed vitamin and mineral supplements. In Europe, monogastrics must be fed with 95% organic feed until 31 December 2017. From first of January 2018, monogastrics will have to be fed 100% organic.
- Organically raised animals may not be given hormones or antibiotics in growth promotion
- Vaccines and other holistic forms of preventive management are allowed, so long as they fall within the Organic Materials Review Institute (OMRI) guidelines
- Producers are not allowed to withhold treatment from a sick or injured animal; yet animals treated with a prohibited medication may not be sold as organic
- All organically raised animals must have access to the outdoors; and conversely in colder climates access to indoors
- Swine and livestock can be confined temporarily for reasons of health, safety, the animal's stage of production, and soil and water quality protection
- Managed organically from the last third of gestation
- A description of the management practices and barriers established to prevent commingling of organic and non-organic animals in split operations with proper paperwork and list of substances used

=== Limitations for organic diets ===
Organic diets may include none of the following:

- Genetically modified grain or grain by-products
- Antibiotics
- Artificial hormones
- Animal by-products
- Grain by-products unless produced from certified organic crops
- Chemically extracted feeds (such as solvent-extracted soybean meal)
- Synthetic amino acids

Swine production requires the use of a number of breeds, crossbreeding with both conventional breeding and artificial insemination utilized by producers. Breeds utilized by organic producers vary depending on the region, management system, and products in demand. Many larger farms will use common breeds such as, Duroc, Berkshire, or Chester White, while others will use exotic breeds for artisan meats, especially on European farms. The high biodiversity of organic farms provides many ecological services that enhance farm resilience to a large extent. Integrated farming systems involving both crop and livestock production in a closed system can reduce financial risk for the producer, since organic producers generally receive premiums or higher prices for their products sold that cover and possibly reduce disease risk so long as there is no outside contact with other pigs or animals, such as cows, or poultry.

== Common organic swine housing ==
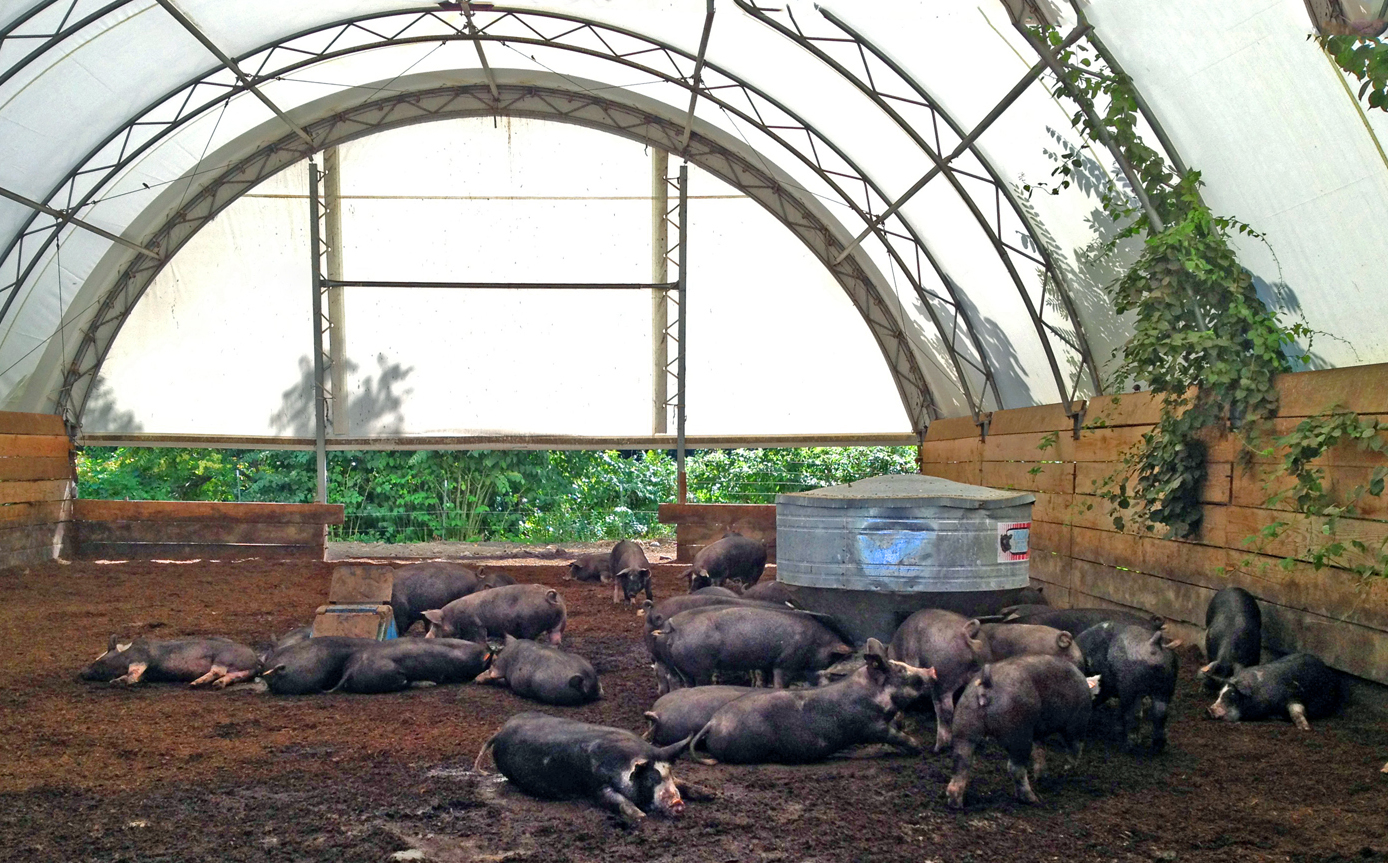
Farm pigs feeding in a traditional hoop house building without any concrete flooring

Since the requirements of organic swine systems require outdoor access and greater space requirements per animal than conventional systems, breeds and breeding management are very important for producers. The environment (geographical location, housing, contact with other animals) of the animal is one of the most important determinants of disease risk and exposure for organic swine. Typical controlled animal feeding operation (CAFO) production is characterized by slatted flooring; no bedding, controlled feeding, and strict production sectioning and isolation between groups. Typical organic systems include the following:

=== Hoop house/ traditional barn system ===
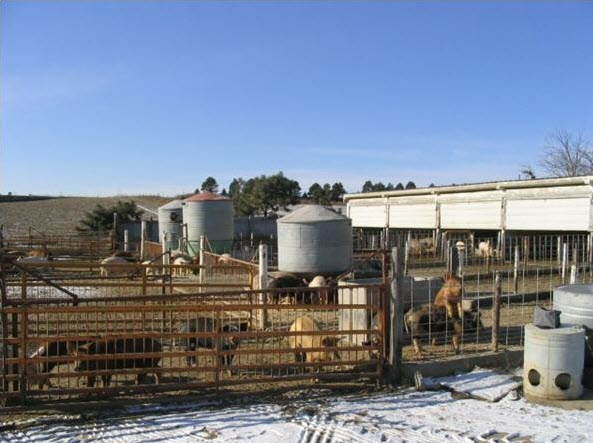
Swine system with both indoor and outdoor access located on an Iowa organic farm

Simple structures originally developed in Canada, built at low cost, approximately a US$4 reduction per pig. These structures allow for low-odor, high ventilation, but in colder temperate zones, hoop buildings present challenges for producers to overcome, including proper bedding and disease management. They are used by organic and conventional producers alike to manage large fluctuations of pig flow numbers for larger systems. Traditional barn structures, with access to both indoor and outdoor environments are also common systems for producers.

=== Pasture-based systems ===
Outdoor pig production has historical traditions, especially in Europe. Both the sows and finishing pigs are kept permanently on pasture, including during winter months for sows. The majority of growing or ‘feeder’ pigs are moved indoors for the fattening period, e.g. to a deep litter system. Animals are more environmentally adapted to outdoor surroundings, as breeding and genetics play an important role. Additionally, a major difference between conventional, outdoor production and organic production is the high proportion of silage and roughage in the organic feed. Therefore, finding adequate protein and proper nutrition are often challenges for many farmers.

=== Forest based systems ===
A third major system is a traditional forested or Mediterranean pastoral system. This involves indigenous and exotic breeds pastured in natural forests for the production of high-value cuts for restaurants or specialty foods. Furthermore, living semi-wild, all phases of production take place outdoors, sometimes in extreme conditions. Swine populations in this case are extremely low compared to world averages. Management is similar to pasture raised swine where animals will have less direct contact with humans with larger areas to roam and root. Finding adequate protein and proper nutrition are challenges, depending on the breed and environment and geographic location.

== Common organic swine diseases ==
Organic livestock are not immune to diseases, and are likely to share the same overall disease statues with regard to contagious diseases at the national herd level. At all stages of the life cycle, animals may be exposed to diseases and in the case of organic swine, without the availability of normal industry drugs and prophylactic medication; as internal parasites are a large component of risk. Cross species exposure and contamination are direct concerns for many producers. Internal parasites and cohabitation of animals can lead to exposure, depending on local environment conditions and herd population. In fact, in a 2003 study from 31 organic chicken flocks sampled for bacterial pathogens, 13% were positive for Salmonella and 35% for campylobacter, as contact with other animals cited as the primary exposure route. Additionally, cross contamination on integrated livestock can be problematic, but is dependent on a multitude of variables, including density of the livestock operations, introduction of replacement breeding stock, sharing of facilities, etc. Pigs raised according to general organic certification requirements are as susceptible to diseases as conventional breeds, based on genetics, environment, and diet. Pork diseases vary widely based on localized region and country. Generally, organic production requires extensive management and can be more labor-intensive than conventional systems, where access to Many producers do give vaccines for E. coli, pseudorabies virus, Bordetella bronchiseptica, porcine parvovirus, and Erysipelothrix rhusiopathiae among others. It is particularly important to tailor individual farm health security measures according to existing disease status of the swine stock, in order to guarantee financial sustainability of required investments.

In many European countries where certain diseases have not been detected, (PRRS, TGE, swine fever, etc.) vaccines are not usually given. In organic pig production, respiratory diseases and lameness have been cited as the most common health detriments, and depending on the location, a lesser prevalence exists conventional production. Since antibiotics are not allowed to maintain the organic integrity of an animal, some producers will forgo antibiotics altogether, even with sick animals occurring in the system. However, according to USDA-NOP Guidelines, antibiotics and other treatments that no longer make the animal organic are required to maintain overall herd health. The use of antibiotics in herds with organic fattening pigs is lower compared to herds with conventional pigs. This is probably a result of the alternative system leading to a lower infection level, since no difference in mortality pigs could be discovered. As a large percentage of organic pork production systems are pasture-based, or not living on concrete, a degree of risk is present from soil based pathogenic exposure. There are options for producers, including organically approved bio-control agents, diatomaceous earth (DE), and acidified grain rations, among others. However, many of these contain anecdotal evidence only, and the study on pasture rotation to control parasitic infections is largely unknown and research is required.

=== Exposure risk in pasture swine systems ===
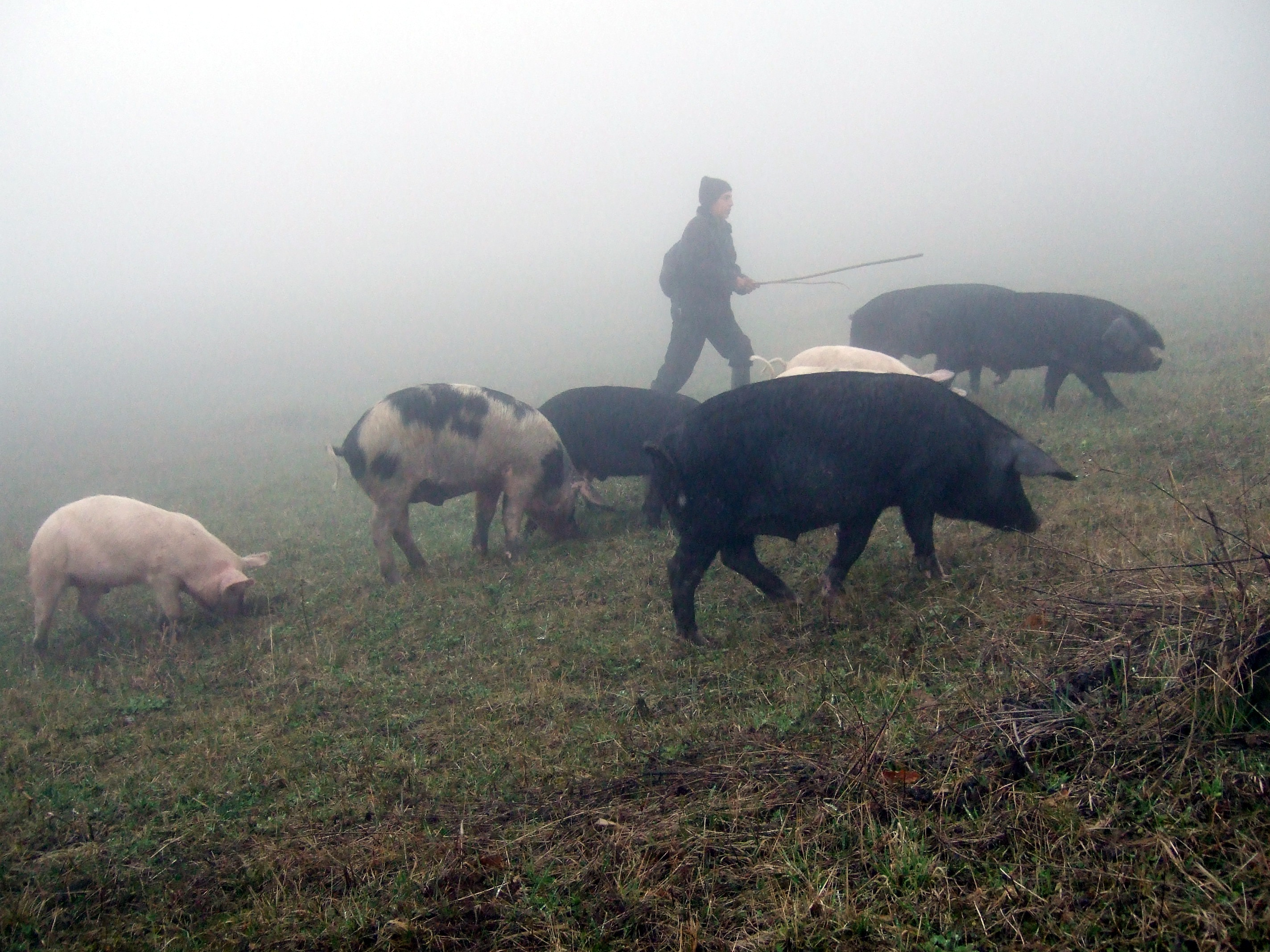
Organic pasture pork systems are often frequented by indigenous or exotic breeds.

A degree of risk to exposure to swine diseases is observed in pasture swine systems. Especially in Europe, but not limited to the region, pasture or soil related parasites are important to consider, as several studies in northern temperate climate have indicated that outdoor production have resulted in heavier and more prevalent helminth (parasitic worms) infections as compared to conventional intensive production under indoor conditions. Because pigs are rooting animals and will dig up and consume soil at varying amounts, the exposure route makes control a difficult management option for organic producers. Additionally, parasitism risk can be greater in regions where worm eggs remain viable in the soil for extended periods and can reinfect populations. The potential risk of introduction of parasitic worms will depend on the prevalence of the infection in the environment, neighboring farm prevalence, pasture management and other preventive measures including waste and dead animal disposal.

Additionally, toxoplasmosis, a disease caused by Toxoplasma gondii is prevalent in organic pastured systems for swine. Although commonly occurring in uncooked meat, toxoplasmosis has been also found in outdoor livestock systems, where controlled, indoor swine environments have been dramatically reduced. A large degree of risk does exist with the potential of Toxoplasma exposure, although many farms currently remain free of this pathogen. Although not as serious as other diseases (Toxoplasma gondii does affect and can kill animals with weak immune systems), uncooked meat from the animals in question can contain the disease. The significance of parasitic infections with respect to health and productivity in pigs under organic outdoor systems remains to be documented. Such diseases do pose risk in pasture systems. Since there are generally fewer population numbers, risk of transmission to other animals is lower, yet exposure to feces and cross-contamination from other animals is a possibility. Providing proper nutrition is necessary to avoid weak immune systems and provide greater resistance of pathogens—utilizing proper forages, grasses, and mineral availability are necessary. For instance, good quality forage can replace up to 50% of grain and supplement needs for many sows in pastures. Organic producers should maintain buffers and adequate housing to maintain proper swine health. The issue of cannibalism, by sows eating piglets, or pigs eating a diseased pig of the same size can be a concern. There is evidence that suggests this is a growing concern in outdoor and pasture systems.

=== Exposure risk in hoop house/ barn systems ===
Animals in traditional barns and hoop buildings show less risk than with animals in pasture raised systems. Although density numbers are generally larger than that of pasture systems, most animals still have access to outdoors and air movement. Although organic rules do not require hardened floors, most (but not all) systems have animals on concrete and shy from soil based systems to avoid rooting. Many barns utilize straw for bedding and warmth, particularly in cold weather regions. Therefore, toxoplasmosis has not been found in such systems where animals have concrete flooring. Such soil-based pathogens, including Trichinella spp are in lower levels in hoop house/barns. As stated earlier, since every system is unique, it is difficult to state hoop house/barn systems posing a less risk as it should be defined by a case-by-case basis. However, in many farms, exposure to fomites, (cats, rodents, unfiltered air from poor ventilation) is a large concern for producers in all production systems. As vectors, such animals that carry zoonotic diseases can infect and destroy herds very rapidly.

Respiratory diseases that are common among conventional swine farms are still possible to be contracted in these organic systems. PRRS, Circovirus, and clostridial enteritis, among others, can be present in these systems. Crowding, mixing of groups, and diets all play a role in disease risk management, and sound holistic management including proper feed rations, vaccines, bedding, are used by organic producers to manage diseases and maintain herd health. Certain risks do exist and should be noted. Raccoon, pests, and other fomites that can bring farm-to-farm disease transmission may use bedding for nests. Off-farm purchased straw and other outside inputs as such can carry diseases and should therefore be monitored. Regarding stocking density, buildings should provide for the species, age, comfort, and well-being of the animals. This is an important tool is managing disease risk, including limiting issues such as tail, ear, and vulva biting.

== Other considerations ==
The quarantine period of animals purchased from other farms, an important consideration in swine health, is necessary to acclimate the animal and reduce immediate disease exposure. Both in the U.K., and U.S., there are no quarantine requirements and testing procedures for incoming stock, unless individual certification regulators implement barriers for animals coming from conventional farms. Other measures common in both conventional and organic systems must be taken into consideration, such as farm visitors, preventing exposure to contaminated ground water, and disinfection of buildings among others. Additionally, closed system (all-in, all-out) production is important, as is off-site finishing of market animals. Keeping the breeding herd and the farrowing of sows on another farm is often preferred and utilized by producers. Such measures usually involve sound management and are not always a result from housing and environment considerations of the animal. For instance, diarrhea in piglets (scours) can be of concern and many producers utilize late-weaning of piglets, where the animal is over six weeks old at separation. This is likely to decrease problems associated with post-weaning including the risk of viral and bacterial infections. These are not unique to organic or conventional farms. Overall, such external challenges (including disease management) facing organic livestock farms can be similar to those facing similar conventional farms in the same region; where the treatment options usually differ.

Risk of organic swine diseases can be high depending on geographic region, breeds, and farmer management. If those conditions are met, certain risks of parasites can affect swine herds. Based strictly on systems, pasture raised organic pork could lead to parasitic worm ingestion from rooting, although actual cases reported have been minimal. Other environmental factors of pasture including temperature and nutrition make management more challenging. Organic systems with concrete flooring, utilizing barns, hoop houses etc., controlled feeding, pose the lesser amount of risk of disease exposure than pasture based systems. Prevention, rather than treatment is the best option for organic swine producers. To do this, sound holistic management and utilizing all tools available as allowed by the National Organic Program and other international programs are essential.
