= Influenza A virus subtype H1N2 =

Virus classification
- (unranked): Virus
- Realm: Riboviria
- Kingdom: Orthornavirae
- Phylum: Negarnaviricota
- Class: Insthoviricetes
- Order: Articulavirales
- Family: Orthomyxoviridae
- Genus: Alphainfluenzavirus
- Species: Influenza A virus
- Serotype: Influenza A virus subtype H1N2

Variants
- H1N2v

Virus subtype

Influenza A virus subtype H1N2 (A/H1N2) is a subtype of the species Influenza A virus (sometimes called bird flu or swine flu). It is currently endemic in pig populations and is occasionally seen in humans.

The virus does not cause more severe illness than other influenza viruses, and no unusual increases in influenza activity have been associated with it.

== History ==
Between December 1988 and March 1989, 19 influenza H1N2 virus isolates were identified in 6 cities in China, but the virus did not spread further.

A(H1N2) was identified during the 2001–02 flu season (northern hemisphere) in Canada, the U.S., Ireland, Latvia, France, Romania, Oman, India, Malaysia, and Singapore with earliest documented outbreak of the virus occurring in India on May 31, 2001.

On February 6, 2002, the World Health Organization (WHO) in Geneva and the Public Health Laboratory Service (PHLS) in the United Kingdom reported the identification influenza A(H1N2) virus from humans in the UK, Israel, and Egypt.

The 2001–02 Influenza A(H1N2) Wisconsin strain appears to have resulted from the reassortment of the genes of the currently circulating influenza A(H1N1) and A(H3N2) subtypes.

In March 2018 a single case of H1N2 was identified in a 19-month-old in the Netherlands.

In January 2019 a single case of H1N2 was identified in Sweden.

In October 2020, a case of the H1N2 variant H1N2v was confirmed in Alberta, Canada and was the first confirmed human case in the country.

In September 2021, a case was found in France.

In November 2023 a case was found in the UK.

In February 2025, a case was reported in the USA of an adult patient with variant H1N2 (H1N2v), who was sick in January 2025, was hospitalized, and has since recovered. Last season (2023–24), there were 9 variant flu cases, of which 4 involved the H1N2v strain. Three of those cases involved Pennsylvania residents who were exposed to pigs. In June 2025, one case was reported in Durban, South Africa.
