= Small nucleolar RNA SNORA65 =

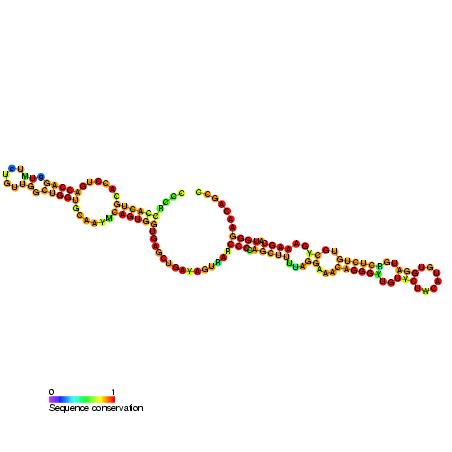
- Predicted secondary structure and sequence conservation of SNORA65

Identifiers
- Symbol: SNORA65
- Alt. Symbols: U65
- Rfam: RF00302

Other data
- RNA type: Gene; snRNA; snoRNA; H/ACA-box
- Domain: Eukaryota
- GO: GO:0006396 GO:0005730
- SO: SO:0000594
- PDB structures: PDBe

In molecular biology, SNORA65 (also known as U65) is a non-coding RNA (ncRNA) molecule which functions in the biogenesis (modification) of other small nuclear RNAs (snRNAs). This type of modifying RNA is located in the nucleolus of the eukaryotic cell which is a major site of snRNA biogenesis. It is known as a small nucleolar RNA (snoRNA) and also often referred to as a 'guide RNA'.

U65 was originally cloned from HeLa cells and belongs to the H/ACA box class of snoRNAs as it has the predicted hairpin-hinge-hairpin-tail structure and has the conserved H/ACA-box motifs. snoRNA U65 is predicted to guide the pseudouridylation of residues U4373 and U4427 of 28S ribosomal RNA (rRNA). Pseudouridylation is the isomerisation of the nucleoside uridine to pseudouridine(Ψ). U65 is related to the snoRNA MBII-351 identified in mouse.
