= 60S ribosomal protein L12 =

Protein found in humans

RPL12
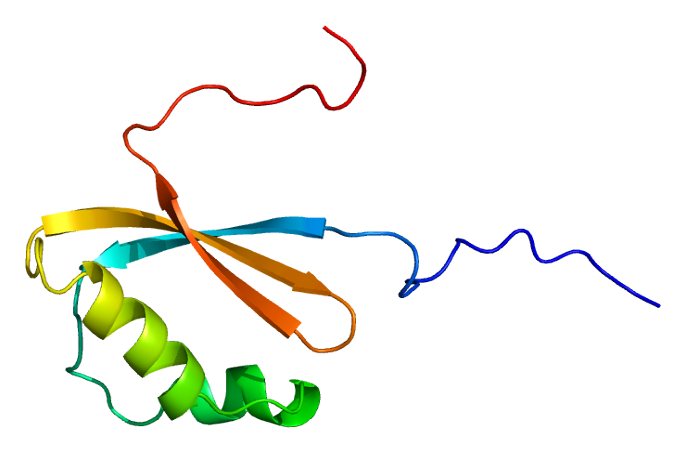

Identifiers
- Aliases: RPL12, L12, ribosomal protein L12
- External IDs: OMIM: 180475; MGI: 98002; GeneCards: RPL12
Available structures
PDB	Ortholog search: PDBe RCSB
PDB	List of PDB id codes 4V6X, 5AJ0, 3J92, 4V5Z, 5A8L

Gene location (Human)
Chr.	Chromosome 9 (human)
Band	9q33.3	Start	127,447,674 bp
Band	9q33.3	End	127,451,406 bp

Gene location (Mouse)
Chr.	Chromosome 2 (mouse)
Band	2|2 B	Start	32,851,571 bp
Band	2|2 B	End	32,855,357 bp
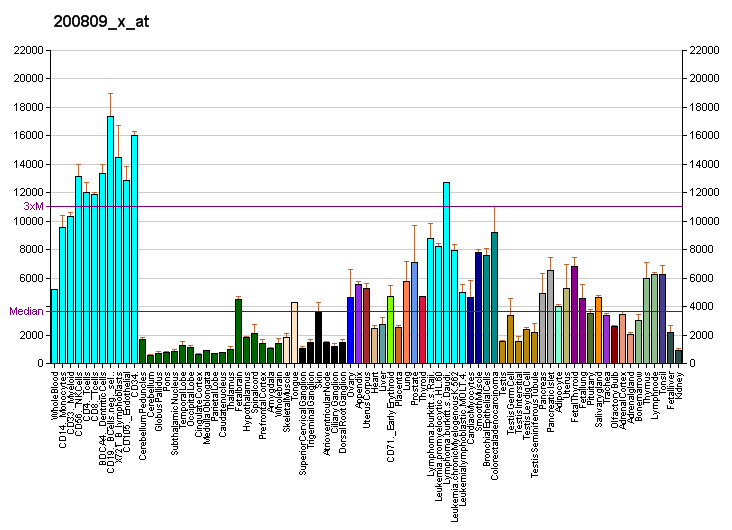

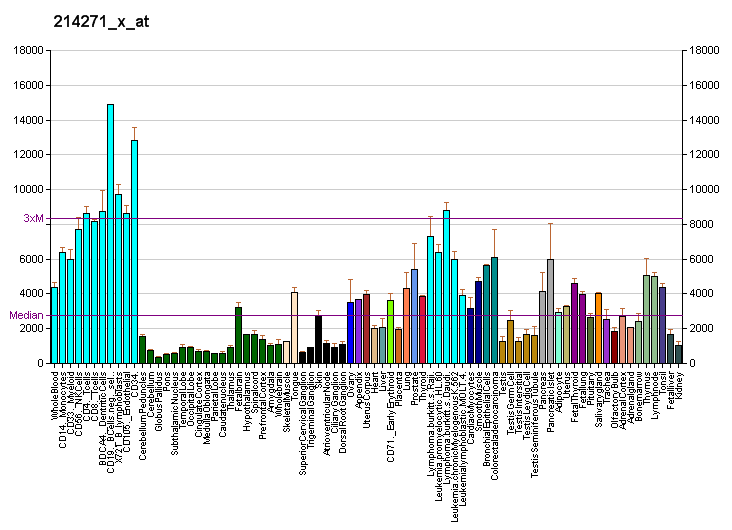
RNA expression pattern
Bgee	Human / Mouse (ortholog); Top expressed in: Achilles tendon; olfactory zone of nasal mucosa; fallopian tube; left ovary; canal of the cervix; skin of abdomen; skin of leg; right ovary; lactiferous gland; gallbladder / Top expressed in: epiblast; embryo; embryo; yolk sac; esophagus; ileum; ventricular zone; uterus; morula; lens; More reference expression data
BioGPS	More reference expression data
Gene ontology
Molecular function	protein binding; structural constituent of ribosome; rRNA binding; RNA binding; large ribosomal subunit rRNA binding
Cellular component	cytosol; extracellular exosome; membrane; cytosolic large ribosomal subunit; focal adhesion; ribosome; extracellular matrix; nucleus; nucleolus; cytoplasm; postsynaptic density; large ribosomal subunit
Biological process	translational initiation; SRP-dependent cotranslational protein targeting to membrane; nuclear-transcribed mRNA catabolic process, nonsense-mediated decay; ribosomal large subunit assembly; viral transcription; protein biosynthesis; rRNA processing
Sources:Amigo / QuickGO
Orthologs
Databases	NCBI: entry; OMA: entry
Species	Human	Mouse
Entrez	6136	269261
Ensembl	ENSG00000197958	ENSMUSG00000038900
UniProt	P30050	P35979
RefSeq (mRNA)	NM_000976	NM_009076
RefSeq (protein)	NP_000967	NP_033102
Location (UCSC)	Chr 9: 127.45 – 127.45 Mb	Chr 2: 32.85 – 32.86 Mb
PubMed search
- Wikidata
View/Edit Human	View/Edit Mouse

60S ribosomal protein L12 is a protein that in humans is encoded by the RPL12 gene.

== Function ==
Ribosomes, the organelles that catalyze protein synthesis, consist of a small 40S subunit and a large 60S subunit. Together these subunits are composed of 4 RNA species and approximately 80 structurally distinct proteins. This gene encodes a ribosomal protein that is a component of the 60S subunit. The protein belongs to the L11P family of ribosomal proteins. It is located in the cytoplasm. The protein binds directly to the 26S rRNA. This gene is co-transcribed with the U65 snoRNA, which is located in its fourth intron. As is typical for genes encoding ribosomal proteins, there are multiple processed pseudogenes of this gene dispersed through the genome.

== Interactions ==
RPL12 has been shown to interact with CDC5L.
