= 60S ribosomal protein L7 =

Protein found in humans

RPL7

Identifiers
- Aliases: RPL7, L7, humL7-1, ribosomal protein L7, ribosomal protein uL30
- External IDs: OMIM: 604166; MGI: 98073; GeneCards: RPL7
Available structures
PDB	Ortholog search: PDBe RCSB
PDB	List of PDB id codes 4UG0, 4V6X, 5AJ0

Gene location (Human)
Chr.	Chromosome 8 (human)
Band	8q21.11	Start	73,290,242 bp
Band	8q21.11	End	73,295,789 bp

Gene location (Mouse)
Chr.	Chromosome 1 (mouse)
Band	1|1 A3	Start	16,171,519 bp
Band	1|1 A3	End	16,174,886 bp
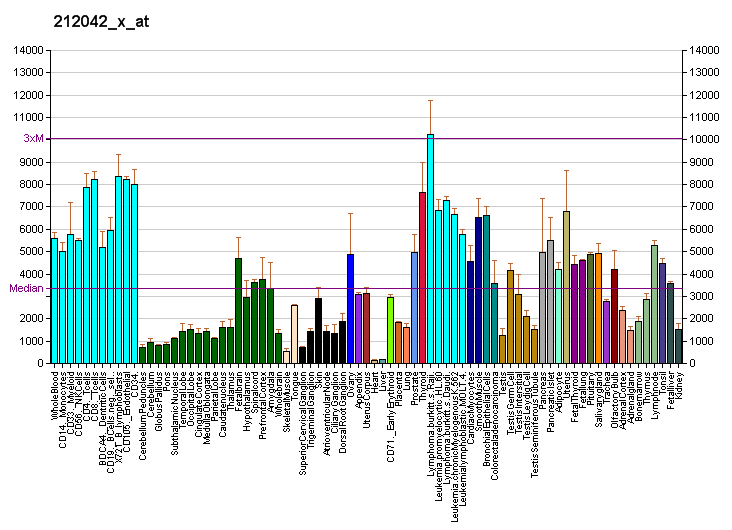

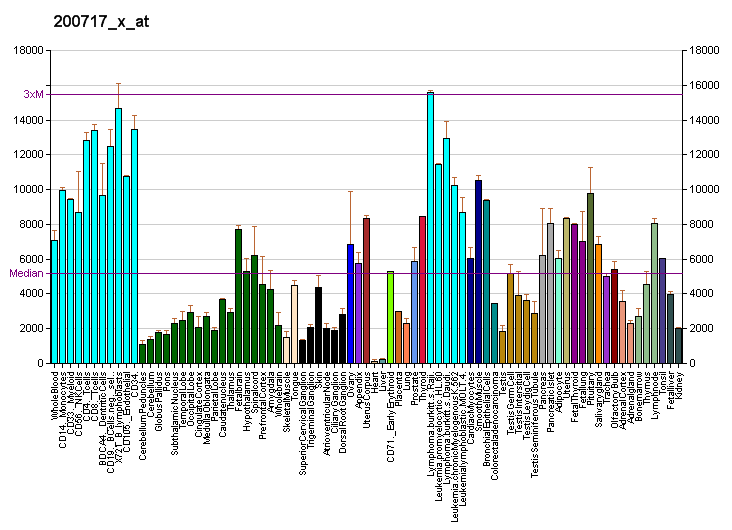
RNA expression pattern
Bgee	Human / Mouse (ortholog); Top expressed in: ganglionic eminence; Achilles tendon; ventricular zone; left ovary; gastric mucosa; right ovary; canal of the cervix; monocyte; smooth muscle tissue; body of uterus / Top expressed in: epiblast; ventricular zone; ganglionic eminence; blastocyst; uterus; zone of skin; lens; morula; esophagus; thymus; More reference expression data
BioGPS	More reference expression data
Gene ontology
Molecular function	protein binding; protein homodimerization activity; DNA binding; mRNA binding; RNA binding; structural constituent of ribosome
Cellular component	ribosome; nucleolus; cytoplasm; cytosol; nucleus; membrane; focal adhesion; extracellular exosome; polysome; cytosolic large ribosomal subunit; postsynaptic density; ribonucleoprotein complex
Biological process	SRP-dependent cotranslational protein targeting to membrane; maturation of LSU-rRNA from tricistronic rRNA transcript (SSU-rRNA, 5.8S rRNA, LSU-rRNA); viral transcription; nuclear-transcribed mRNA catabolic process, nonsense-mediated decay; cytoplasmic translation; ribosomal large subunit biogenesis; translational initiation; protein biosynthesis; rRNA processing
Sources:Amigo / QuickGO
Orthologs
Databases	NCBI: entry; OMA: entry
Species	Human	Mouse
Entrez	6129	19989
Ensembl	ENSG00000147604	ENSMUSG00000043716
UniProt	P18124	P14148
RefSeq (mRNA)	NM_000971; NM_001363737	NM_011291
RefSeq (protein)	NP_000962; NP_001350666	NP_035421
Location (UCSC)	Chr 8: 73.29 – 73.3 Mb	Chr 1: 16.17 – 16.17 Mb
PubMed search
- Wikidata
View/Edit Human	View/Edit Mouse

60S ribosomal protein L7 is a protein that in humans is encoded by the RPL7 gene.

== Function ==
Ribosomes, the organelles that catalyze protein synthesis, consist of a small 40S subunit and a large 60S subunit. Together these subunits are composed of 4 RNA species and approximately 80 structurally distinct proteins. This gene encodes a ribosomal protein that is a component of the 60S subunit. The protein belongs to the L30P family of ribosomal proteins. It contains an N-terminal basic region-leucine zipper (BZIP)-like domain and the RNP consensus sub-motif RNP2. In vitro the BZIP-like domain mediates homodimerization and stable binding to DNA and RNA, with a preference for 28S rRNA and mRNA. The protein can inhibit cell-free translation of mRNAs, suggesting that it plays a regulatory role in the translation apparatus. It is located in the cytoplasm. The protein has been shown to be an autoantigen in patients with systemic autoimmune diseases, such as systemic lupus erythematosus. As is typical for genes encoding ribosomal proteins, there are multiple processed pseudogenes of this gene dispersed through the genome.

== Interactions ==
RPL7 has been shown to interact with ZNF7. It interacts with HIV-1 Gag protein through Zinc Finger of HIV-1 Gag.
