= Date face mask =

Person wearing a face mask for non-hygienic purposes

Date face mask (Japanese: だてマスク or 伊達マスク, Hepburn: Date-masuku), refers to a person in Japan who wears a surgical mask for a non-medical or non-hygienic purpose. The date face mask became more common in Japan during the COVID-19 pandemic.

== History ==
=== 2009 swine flu pandemic ===
After the 2009 swine flu pandemic, some young people in urban areas continued to wear face masks.

=== Covid-19 pandemic ===
When the COVID-19 pandemic began in Japan in early 2020, the government of Japan, authorities, companies, and schools required people to wear masks outside of private residences.

From May 2022, the government of Japan said, "people who are outdoors don't need to use masks, indoors, they must use it in crowded areas. (However, the government of Japan said "Face masks are not required when you are not talking with others, and not at close range indoors, but wear masks when talking with others at close range outdoors.)"

On 10 February 2023, the government of Japan officially said using a face mask was a personal choice as of 13 March. Many people continued to wear masks, especially indoors. A report from Nippon TV, on 10 April 2023, found that 85.6% of pedestrians near Tokyo Station were still masked.

== Motivations ==
Those who wear face masks for non-medical or non-hygienic purposes cite multiple motivations. These include:

- A sense of calm or security
- Avoiding public scolding
- Insecurities related to one's face
- Concealing one's identity
- Avoiding conversations
- Having more confidence when in conversations
- Concealing facial expressions
- To hide sleepiness at work
- Cosmetic purpose to moisturize lips and face from dryness when sleeping.
- UV protection
- Concealing that they are not wearing makeup or not clean shaven
- Prevention of an unpleasant smell from breath
- An appeal to sympathy, as might be extended to unwell/sick people

== See also ==
- Face mask
- Surgical mask
- 2009 swine flu pandemic in Japan
- COVID-19 pandemic in Japan
- Culture of Japan
