= Theraderm =

American skincare company

Theraderm is an American manufacturer of clinical-grade skin care products, including anti-aging creams and moisturizers, as well as an acne system under an alternate brand: Reversion. The company was founded in 1996 by board-certified plastic and reconstructive surgeon James Beckman, M.D., who is also a biochemist and adjunct associate professor of dermatology at UAMS Medical School. The company is headquartered in Springdale, Arkansas.

== History ==
In 1978, Dr. James Beckman set up a private practice for plastic and reconstructive surgery in Mountain Home, Arkansas. After treating a number of burn patients, Dr. Beckman developed a cream, Beckman's Skin Care Cream, for restoring mobility and function to patients with skin-grafted hands.

After further development and discovering new ingredients, he created a second product, resulting in a two-step system that moisturized skin and also reduced the appearance of lines and wrinkles. In 1996, the company was founded (initially as Therapon Skin Health), and even more research and development led to the four-step Skin Renewal System. This system is still sold by the company today, along with a number of other products that each target a unique skin concern.
