= Foreo =

Swedish beauty technology company

FOREO
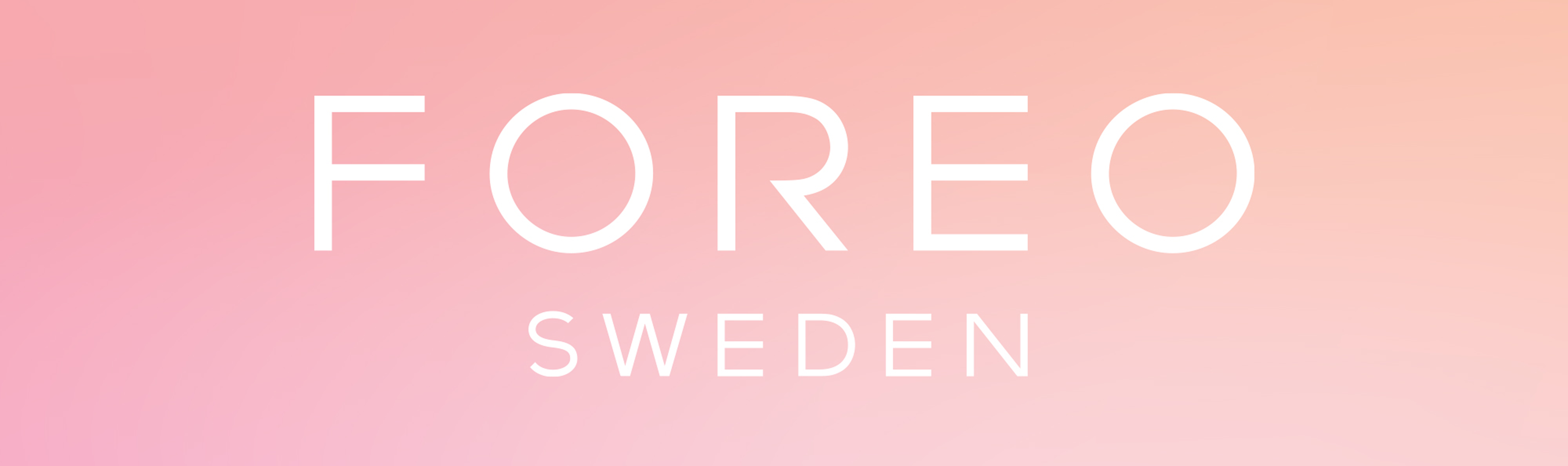
- Type: Private
- Industry: Beauty; Consumer electronics
- Founded: 2013; 13 years ago in Stockholm, Sweden
- Founder: Filip Sedić
- Headquarters: Stockholm, Sweden
- Area served: 80+ countries
- Key people: Filip Sedić (founder)
- Products: LUNA facial cleansing devices; ISSA sonic toothbrush; UFO smart mask device; BEAR microcurrent device; PEACH IPL device; FAQ Swiss LED masks
- Brands: FOREO; FAQ Swiss
- Website: foreo.com

FOREO is a Swedish company that manufactures electronic devices for personal care. Founded in 2013 and headquartered in Stockholm, the company produces facial cleansing tools, oral care devices, and anti-aging equipment using technologies including sonic pulsations, microcurrents, and LED light therapy.

The company's first product was LUNA, a silicone facial cleansing device. Subsequent releases have included ESPADA, which uses blue LED light, UFO, which combines light therapy with temperature variations and the FAQ Swiss line of LED masks. FOREO products are sold in over eighty countries.

== History ==
=== Beginnings and 2010s ===
FOREO was established in Stockholm in 2013 by Filip Sedić. According to company accounts, Sedić developed the first LUNA device after observing skin irritation caused by conventional facial brushes. LUNA used silicone bristles and sonic pulsations rather than nylon brushes. The name LUNA was reportedly chosen in reference to the silicone used in space suit boots, while FOREO was derived from the phrase For EveryOne is taken from a Queen song.

In 2014, FOREO entered the U.S. market and introduced its first oral care product, the ISSA silicone toothbrush.

In 2016, the company introduced IRIS, an eye massage device. ESPADA, an LED device for acne-prone skin, received FDA clearance and was introduced in 2017.

At the Consumer Electronics Show in Las Vegas in 2018, the company introduced UFO, a device for sheet masks that integrates LED light with warming and cooling functions.

In 2019, the company opened a retail location at London Heathrow Airport.

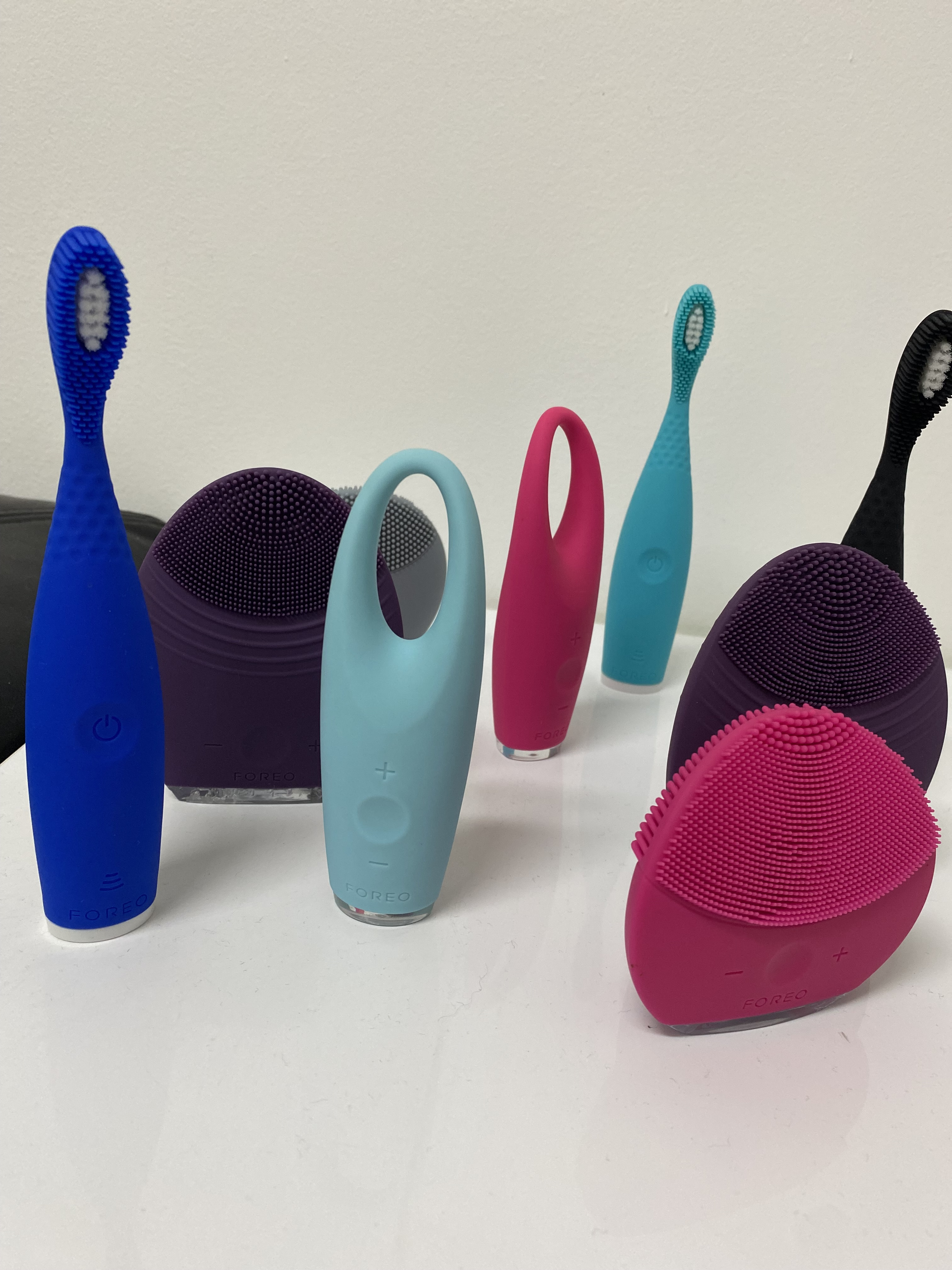
FOREO devices

=== 2020s and international expansion ===
in 2020, FOREO launched BEAR, a microcurrent facial device that received FDA clearance and PEACH, an IPL hair removal device. The company introduced FAQ Swiss. A brand focused on LED light therapy masks for anti-aging.

By 2021, Forbes reported that FOREO had sold over 36 million products and operated in more than 75 countries, with 3,000 employees. The company was ranked among the top three most-Googled skincare brands globally that year, according to data from online retailer Lookfantastic. The company was developing several technologies at that time, including precision laser systems, computer vision for skin recognition, and hair follicle rejuvenation.

In 2022, the company released NFT versions of its LUNA devices. FOREO stated that proceeds were donated to mental health and dermatology charities. The company also expanded its retail presence to WOW Concept in Madrid and Galeries Lafayette in Paris and partnered with Shiseido for a promotional campaign in Spain.

In 2023, the FAQ 200 LED Face Mask was released. The Times described it as the best anti-aging LED mask in their testing. A cosmetics line was also launched that year.

In 2024, the company released FAQ 301, a device for hair loss. The appearance of LUNA 3 in the fourth season of Emily in Paris was followed by reported sales of over fifty-five thousand units in the UK and US within several weeks. Actress Michelle Monaghan included LUNA 4 in a list of her preferred beauty products, and the device was featured on The Drew Barrymore Show in early 2025.

The FAQ 400 series was announced in May 2025, followed by FAQ 500 in September 2025. The company described the latter as the first full-spectrum red light facial device.

In 2025, the company launched FOREO For Everyone, a product line positioned as a lower-priced alternative to its existing devices.

As of 2025, the company reports presence in eighty countries, twenty offices, and a workforce that is seventy-one percent female. FOREO products have received awards from publications including Marie Claire, Elle, Allure, Cosmopolitan, Harper's Bazaar, and Glamour, as well as nominations at the Rakuten Golden Link Awards, Beauty Innovation Awards, Natural Health Beauty Awards, and Dutch Beauty Awards.

== Environmental claims ==
The company states that 99% of its suppliers operate locally. Its factories are powered by solar energy and the devices are designed for minimum power consumption. The manufacturer also maintains a zero-animal-testing policy.
