= Mask (disambiguation) =

A mask is a covering worn on the face, or an object depicting a face.

Mask or MASK or M.A.S.K. may also refer to:

== Technology ==
=== Computing ===
- Mask (computing), in computer science, a bit pattern used to extract information from another bit pattern
  - Affinity mask, a bit mask indicating what processor a thread or process should be run on
  - Image mask, applied to digital images to "cut-out" the background or other unwanted features
  - umask, the default permission setting for new files on UNIX systems

=== Other technologies ===
- Photomask, used to create the circuit layers in IC fabrication
- Front-end mask, an automobile accessory
- Shadow mask, a technology used to manufacture cathode ray tube televisions that produce color images
- Spectral mask, a mathematically defined set of lines applied to the levels of radio transmissions in telecommunications

== Arts and media ==
=== Film and television ===
- Mask (1985 film), a film directed by Peter Bogdanovich
- Mask, the (1994 film), a film starring Jim Carrey
- M.A.S.K. (franchise), a media franchise comprising toys, animated series, and other media
- M.A.S.K. (TV series), an animated television series, part of the M.A.S.K. media franchise
- Mask (2015 TV series), a South Korean television series
- Mask (2018 film), a Bengali film directed by Rajiv Biswas
- Mask (2019 film), a Malayalam film directed by Sunif Hanif
- Masks (1920 film), a German silent film directed by William Wauer
- Masks (1929 film), a German film directed by Rudolf Meinert
- Masks (1987 film), a French film directed by Claude Chabrol
- Masked (film), a 1920 Western starring Hoot Gibson
- "Masks" (Star Trek: The Next Generation), a 1994 seventh season episode of the TV series Star Trek: The Next Generation
- Masked (The Secret Circle), an episode of the TV series The Secret Circle

=== Other fiction ===
- Mask (Forgotten Realms), a deity in the Dungeons & Dragons Forgotten Realms campaign setting
- Masks (Angel comic), a comic based on the Angel television series
- Mask (DC Comics), a fictional DC Comics character
- Masks, an eight issue mini series by Dynamite Entertainment
- Mask De Mascline, a fictional character from Bleach
- Masks (novel), a 1958 novel by Fumiko Enchi
- Masks (short story), a short story by Damon Knight

=== Music ===
- Mask (Aco album), 2006
- Mask (Bauhaus album), 1981
- Mask (Fanatic Crisis album), 1996
- Mask (Roger Glover album), 1984
- Mask (Vangelis album), 1985
- "Mask" (Dream song), 2021
- "Mask" (Ayumi Hamasaki song), 2022
- "Mask", a song by James from the album Living in Extraordinary Times
- Masks (album), a 2013 album by Eyes Set to Kill
- "Masks", a song by Prodigal from the album Electric Eye
- Mask, a 1980s rock band whose vocalist was José Fors

=== Other arts ===
- Masking (art), materials used to protect portions of a work from unintended change, such as masking tape, frisket, and stencils
- Masking (illustration), a drawing technique that originated in Japan

== Other uses ==
- "Mask", nickname of Charles Lewis Jr. (1963–2009), co-founder of clothing line TapouT
- MASK, an MI5 operation (1934–1937) that decrypted Communist International radio communications
- Mask, Mazandaran, a village in Mazandaran Province, Iran
- Mask, South Khorasan, a village in South Khorasan Province, Iran
- Lough Mask, a lake in Mayo County, Ireland

== See also ==
- Face mask (disambiguation)
- Masked ball (disambiguation)
- The Mask (disambiguation)
- Masking (disambiguation)
- Masque
