= The Mask =

The Mask may refer to:

== Literature ==
=== Books ===
- "The Mask", 1889 short story by French author Guy de Maupassant
- "The Mask", 1892 short story by Richard Marsh
- The Mask (French: Le Masque), 1894 novel by Gilbert Augustin-Thierry
- "The Mask" (Chambers short story), 1895 short story by American author Robert W. Chambers, part of the book The King in Yellow
- The Mask, 1905 novel by William Le Queux
- The Mask, 1912 poetry book by J. Redwood Anderson
- "The Mask", 1912 short story by F. Tennyson Jesse
- The Mask, 1913 novel by Arthur Hornblow Sr. (1865–1942), father of Arthur Hornblow Jr., basis for the 1921 film
- "The Mask", 1915 short story by Bernard Capes, featured in the 1989 book The Black Reaper
- The Mask, 1919 novel by John Cournos
- "The Mask", 1925 short story by Vernon Knowles, featured in the book The Street of Queer Houses and Other Stories
- "The Mask", 1934 short story by Henry de Vere Stacpoole, featured in the book My Grimmest Nightmare
- The Mask, 1957 novel by Stuart Cloete
- "The Mask", 1974 short story by Sydney James Bounds
- The Mask (Lem short story), 1974 short story by Polish science fiction author Stanisław Lem
- The Mask, 1978 novel by Eve Bunting
- The Mask (Koontz novel), 1981 novel written by Dean Koontz under the pseudonym Owen West
- "The Mask", 1985 short story by Joan Clark
- "The Mask", 1988 narrative poem by Leslie Halliwell, part of the collection A Demon on the Stair
- The Mask, 1990 novel by Richard Gordon
- The Mask, 1993 novelette by Richard Laymon
- The Mask, 1993 novel by Scott Ciencin, writing as Nick Baron
- The Mask, novelization of the 1994 film by Steve Perry
- "The Mask", 1994 short story by Michael Swanwick, featured in the 2000 book Tales of Old Earth
- "The Mask", 1998 short story by Gary Myers
- The Mask (Stevens novel), 2015 novel by Taylor Stevens

=== Comics ===
- The Mask, a comics character based on Black Bat appearing in Exciting Comics, published by Standard Comics
- The Mask (comics), a comic book series published by Dark Horse Comics

== Film and television ==
=== The Mask franchise ===
- The Mask (franchise), media franchise based on the comic book series
  - The Mask (1994 film), a comedy starring Jim Carrey
  - Son of the Mask, sequel to the 1994 film
  - The Mask: Animated Series, an animated television series

=== Films ===
- The Mask (1919 film), a German silent crime film
- The Mask (1921 film), an American silent mystery film
- Punchinello, a 1926 American short silent film featuring Bela Lugosi, re-released in 1929 with added music and color under the title The Mask
- The Mask (1961 film), a low-budget Canadian horror film produced in 3-D and released by Warner Bros
- The Mask (1988 film), an Italian film
- K-20: Legend of the Mask, a 2008 Japanese action film written and directed by Shimako Satō and based on a novel by Sō Kitamura and its sequel

=== Television episodes ===
- "The Mask", Alcoa Presents One Step Beyond season 2, episode 24 (1960)
- "The Mask", Courage the Cowardly Dog season 4, episode 7 (2002)
- "The Mask", Danger Bay season 1, episode 17 (1985)
- "The Mask", Gotham season 1, episode 8 (2014)
- "The Mask", Just Shoot Me! season 3, episode 3 (1998)
- "The Mask", Mysticons season 2, episode 7 (2018)
- "The Mask", Naturally, Sadie season 2, episode 14 (2006)
- "The Mask", Paradise Falls season 1, episode 8 (2001)
- "The Mask", Pat the Dog season 2, episode 22 (2018)
- "The Mask", Power Play season 2, episode 8 (1999)
- "The Mask", Putham Pudhu Kaalai Vidiyaadhaa episode 4 (2022)
- "The Mask", Space Ghost Coast to Coast special 1 (1994)
- "The Mask", Stolen Voices, Buried Secrets season 2, episode 3 (2011)
- "The Mask", Teen Titans Go! season 2, episode 17 (2014)
- "The Mask", The Unexpected episode 25 (1952)
- "The Masks", The Twilight Zone (1959) season 5, episode 25 (1964)

== Music ==
- "The Mask", a song by Dangerdoom featuring Ghostface Killah from the album The Mouse and the Mask
- "The Mask", a song by Black Light Burns from their album Cruel Melody

== Other ==
- The Mask, a defunct publication of the Kappa Psi pharmaceutical fraternity
- The Mask, a 1868 monthly review edited by Leopold David Lewis and Alfred Thompson
- The Mask (journal), a theatre magazine periodically published from 1908 to 1921
- Careto (malware) or The Mask, a piece of espionage malware discovered in 2014
- The Mask (video game), a Super NES side-scrolling action game based on the 1994 film

== See also ==
- Mask (disambiguation)
- Mukhosh (disambiguation) (lit. 'The Mask')
