= Masking =

Masking can mean:

== Arts and media ==
- Masking (art), protecting a selected area from change during production, as with tape and stencils
- Masking (illustration), an art technique that influences the intended perception of a character
- MASKING, the stage name of Masuki Satō, a fictional character from BanG Dream!

== Data protection ==
- Data masking, replacing data with random characters or data to conceal sensitive information
  - Blinded experiment, in which data is masked to prevent bias
- Masking (Electronic Health Record), patient-requested concealment of information from healthcare providers
- Masking and unmasking by intelligence agencies, to protect the privacy of unintentional surveillance targets
- Sound masking, intentional introduction of background sounds to improve comfort and privacy

== Sensory phenomena ==
- Auditory masking, sensory phenomena where perception of one sound is affected by another
  - Temporal masking
  - Simultaneous masking
- Visual masking
- Backward masking, in psychovisual or psychoacoustics

== Other technologies ==
- Mask (computing), AND'ing or OR'ing a bit pattern with another bit pattern to select certain bits
- Masking agent, a reagent used in chemical analysis which reacts with chemical species which may interfere in the analysis
- Sound masking, intentional introduction of background sounds to improve comfort and privacy
- Spectral mask, a method for reducing adjacent-channel interference in broadcast applications

== Other uses ==
- Masking (behavior), in which an individual changes their personality to conform to social pressure
- Autistic masking, the suppression of autistic behaviors and compensation of social difficulties in autistic people
- Female masking, a form of male cross-dressing
- Applying or using a facial mask
- Mardi Gras Indians, sometimes called Black Masking Indians

== See also ==
- Mask (disambiguation)
