= The Catch (novel) =

2014 thriller novel by Taylor Stevens

- Author: Taylor Stevens
- Series: Vanessa Michael Munroe
- Publisher: Crown Publishing Group
- Publication date: July 15, 2014
- ISBN: 9780385348935
- Preceded by: The Doll
- Followed by: The Mask

The Catch is a 2014 thriller novel by Taylor Stevens, the fourth book in her Vanessa Michael Munroe series.

== Reception ==
Kirkus Reviews called the Stevens's writing style "spare" and "gritty." Considering the novel's character, they wrote, "In the hands of any other writer, Stevens’ Munroe might sound a little too Ethan Hunt to wax believable, but she's not. She's a fierce, even vicious fighter, driven by demons that prevent her from claiming happiness." However, they find Munroe to be "one of the genre’s most compelling characters."

Publishers Weekly called the novel "flawed," noting that, unlike previous novels in the series, "Munroe lacks a clear motivation" for her actions, though, as always, she "makes for an intriguing action hero." They also indicated "readers are likely to find themselves cringing at some overgeneralizations," though "the fight scenes are refreshingly stark and well paced."

Booklist and Library Journal also reviewed the novel.
