= The Doll (Stevens novel) =

2013 mystery novel by Taylor Stevens

- Author: Taylor Stevens
- Series: Vanessa Michael Munroe
- Publisher: Crown Publishing Group
- Publication date: June 4, 2013
- Awards: Barry Award for Best Thriller (2014)
- ISBN: 9780307888785
- Preceded by: The Innocent
- Followed by: The Catch

The Doll is a 2013 mystery novel by Taylor Stevens, the third book in her Vanessa Michael Munroe series. The Doll won the 2014 Barry Award for Best Thriller.

== Reception ==
Publishers Weekly called The Doll "harrowing," noting that "at story’s end, none of the players [characters] is left unscathed." They highlighted the continued development of Munroe's character, saying she "remains as compelling as ever: violent yet protective of innocence, imprisoned by not only her past but also the choices she has made in response to it, and painfully conscious of her closeness to sanity’s edge."

Kirkus Reviews referred to the novel as "powerfully contained," similarly stating, "there is no release for the tormented heroine, only license to live another day."

Shelf Awareness's Julia Jenkins wrote, "Stevens again crafts a lightning-swift plot that races across continents and inflicts extreme trauma upon characters she's taught us to care about. Intelligent action and pacing are a bonus, and other characters [...] are engaging and provide banter; but it's Munroe herself who stars, with her wondrous and myriad abilities and her surprisingly soft heart."

Booklist and Library Journal also reviewed the novel.

== Awards and honors ==
The Doll won the 2014 Barry Award for Best Thriller.
