= Mukhosh =

Mukhosh (lit. 'The Mask') may refer to:

- Mukhosh (2020 film), an Indian Bengali-language thriller drama film
- Mukhosh (2021 film), an Indian Bengali-language film by Birsa Dasgupta
- Mukhosh (2022 film), a Bangladeshi mystery thriller film
- Mukhosh (band), a 1990s blues band based in Dhaka, Bangladesh

== See also ==
- The Mask (disambiguation)
