= Face mask =

Face mask may refer to:

- an item of protective equipment that primarily guards the airways:
  - Respirator, including the N95 and FFP2, which are designed for the prevention of airborne pathogens like COVID-19, the flu, and tuberculosis
  - Surgical mask
  - Cloth face mask
  - Dust mask
- Diving mask, for use underwater
- Facemask (orthodontics), used for correcting teeth misalignments
- Facial mask, used for cosmetic skin treatment
- Face mask (gridiron football), in sports
- A mask for the face, typically used in rituals, performance art and as a disguise mostly during the Halloween holiday.
- Face mask (We people), a West African wooden mask at the Indianapolis Museum of Art, Indiana, US

== See also ==
- Face masks during the COVID-19 pandemic
- Hypomimia or masked facies, a medical sign
- Full-face diving mask, for underwater diving
- Simple face mask, for oxygen therapy
- Mask (disambiguation)
- Face (disambiguation)
