= The Innocent (Stevens novel) =

2011 mystery novel by Taylor Stevens

- Author: Taylor Stevens
- Series: Vanessa Michael Munroe (novel series)
- Publisher: Crown Publishing Group
- Publication date: December 27, 2011
- ISBN: 9780307717122
- Preceded by: The Informationist
- Followed by: The Doll

The Innocent is a 2011 mystery novel by Taylor Stevens.

== Reception ==
In a starred review, Publishers Weekly called the novel "impressive," noting that "the gripping plot runs on adrenaline as much as does Vanessa, who unleashes her violent tendencies when the powerless are threatened." They concluded by saying, "The complicated Vanessa makes for an intriguing heroine—at once tough, fearless, vulnerable, and compassionate."

Shelf Awareness's Julia Jenkins also praised the novel, saying it is "tight and fast-paced, an adrenaline rush of a novel with vibrant settings." Jenkins noted that "the descriptions of The Chosen's abuses of its own members are heartwrenching; Stevens's own experience [having been born into the Children of God] in such a world makes this semiautobiographical novel's emotional impact even stronger." Jenkins also highlighted the main character of Munroe, calling her the novel's "greatest strength."

Kirkus Reviews, however, found that the novel is "a disappointing second effort from Stevens, who interrupts Munroe’s gore fests for diatribes you’ve heard before about the sexism and debauchery of cults. Imagine."

Booklist and Library Journal also reviewed the novel.
