= Liars' Paradox =

2018 mystery novel by Taylor Stevens

- Author: Taylor Stevens
- Publisher: Kensington Publishing
- Publication date: December 18, 2018
- ISBN: 9781496718631
- Followed by: Liars' Legacy

Liars' Paradox is a 2018 mystery novel by Taylor Stevens, the first in her Jack and Jill Thriller series. It is followed by Liars' Legacy.

== Reception ==
Liars Paradox received mixed reviews from critics.

Allison Brennan, writing for Criminal Element, said, "Liars' Paradox is hands-down the best thriller I've read this year." Brennan called the novel "original, cunning, smart, riveting, and relentless; with complex characters, pitch-perfect pacing, and high tension from page one."

Beth Kanell, writing for The New York Journal of Books, called Liars Paradox a "propulsive page-turner," saying the novel's "short, hard-paced action chapters cascade" and compared the work to a "Lee Child thriller."

In a mixed review, Publishers Weekly praised the novel's "cinematic plot," saying its "abundant action, unexpected twists, and a kaleidoscopic narrative keep the pace brisk and the tension high." However, they mentioned that "Stevens takes too long to develop her point-of-view characters, which undermines the story's drama and lessens its emotional heft."

The Dallas Morning News, Shawna Seed also provided a mixed review, writing, "Stevens pushes the writing maxim 'show, don't tell' to its absolute limit and pares exposition to a bare minimum. So much happens so fast that readers may find themselves scrambling to keep up. One action sequence [...] was so chaotic that I was a couple chapters down the road before I realized I'd completely missed the identity and motivation of a shooter." Though Seed conceded that Liars Paradox is "a page-turning thriller," she preferred the nuance of Stevens's previous works, noting that in Liars Paradox, complexity "about the nature of evil, about life on the margins of society [...] doesn't quite come through as clearly."
