= Liars' Legacy =

2019 mystery novel by Taylor Stevens

- Author: Taylor Stevens
- Publisher: Kensington Publishing
- Publication date: December 31, 2019
- ISBN: 9781496718655
- Preceded by: Liars' Paradox

Liars' Legacy is a 2019 mystery novel by Taylor Stevens, the second in her Jack and Jill Thriller series. It is preceded by Liars' Paradox.

== Reception ==
Criminal Element's Allison Brennan, who praised the first book in the series, called Liars' Legacy "a wild ride," stating "the second book is even better than the first." Though Brennan concedes that the book may be more difficult to understand for those who didn't read Liars' Paaradox, she believes "Stevens does a good job of feeding you just enough information about what happened in book one that led them into the situation of book two." Brennan's praise focuses on the in-depth character development and increased nuance in Liars' Legacy.

Other reviews were less positive. Publishers Weekly called Liars' Legacy "taut and twisty" and provided a mixed review, noting that "the alternating points of view require attentive reading as the characters often switch their names, nationalities, and allegiances," and "midway, the numerous double-crosses and master disguises grow a bit tedious."

Henrietta Verma, writing for Booklist, said the multifaceted can be confusing, especially for newcomers to the series, "though the back-of-the-book blurb offers a helpful overview." Despite this, Verman saidwrote "Those willing to weather the intricacies of Stevens’ plotting will be rewarded with an exciting thriller with sympathetic, well-drawn characters."
