= Taylor Stevens =

American author of mystery novels

- Born: 1972/1973; Upstate New York, United States
- Writing career
- Notable works: The Informationist (2011); The Innocent (2011); The Doll (2013); The Catch (2014); The Mask (2015)
- Notable awards: Anthony Award for Best First Novel (2012); Barry Award for Best First Novel (2012); Macavity Award for Best First Mystery (2012); Barry Award for Best Thriller (2014, 2016)

Taylor Stevens (born c. 1973) is an American author of mystery novels. She grew up in the Children of God.

== Early life ==
Circa 1973, Stevens was born in upstate New York as part of the Children of God, her parents having joined the cult in 1969 and 1970, respectively. She has four younger siblings, all of whom were also born into the cult. Due to the cult's beliefs regarding familial bonds, at age 12, Stevens was separated from her biological family. She was also denied access to education beyond the sixth grade. Instead of attending school, much of her childhood was spent on city streets, as she was forced to beg by cult leaders, or care for the commune and the people living there. Before reaching the age of 14, she lived in communes in Mexico, Germany, Austria, France, Switzerland, Japan, and South Korea. At age 15, Stevens began writing stories, which group leaders punished her for, separating her from her peers and calling her "a witch and full of devils."

Following the death of cult leader David Berg in 1994, Stevens and her husband, who was also a member of Children of God, moved to a commune in Kenya, then set out on a successful mission in Equatorial Guinea. With increased confidence from their success away from the Children of God, Stevens moved to Germany with her husband and toddler. In her late twenties, Stevens broke away from the Children of God, marking a significant turning point in her life.

As of 2011, Stevens's father was still involved with the Children of God, though her parents had divorced; she had developed a strong relationship with her mother.

== Awards and honors ==
The Informationist reached the top ten of The New York Times bestseller list.

Awards for Stevens's writing
Year	Title	Award	Result	Ref.
2012	The Informationist	Anthony Award for Best First Novel	Finalist	
2012	The Informationist	Barry Award for Best First Novel	Winner	
2012	The Informationist	Macavity Award for Best First Mystery	Finalist	
2014	The Doll	Barry Award for Best Thriller	Winner	
2016	The Mask	Barry Award for Best Thriller	Winner	

== Personal life ==
As of 2012, Stevens lived near Dallas with her two daughters.

== Publications ==
=== A Jack and Jill Thriller series ===
1. Liars' Paradox. Kensington Publishing. 2018. ISBN 9781496718631.
2. Liars' Legacy. Kensington Publishing. 2019. ISBN 9781496718655.

=== Vanessa Michael Munroe series ===
1. The Informationist. Crown Publishing Group. 2011. ISBN 9780307717092.
2. The Innocent. Crown Publishing Group. 2011. ISBN 9780307717122.
3. The Doll. Crown Publishing Group. 2013. ISBN 9780307888785.
  1. The Vessel. Broadway Books. 2014.
4. The Catch. Crown Publishing Group. 2014. ISBN 9780385348935.
5. The Mask. Crown Publishing Group. 2015. ISBN 9780385348966.
