= Facial =

Procedure involving a variety of skin treatments on the human face

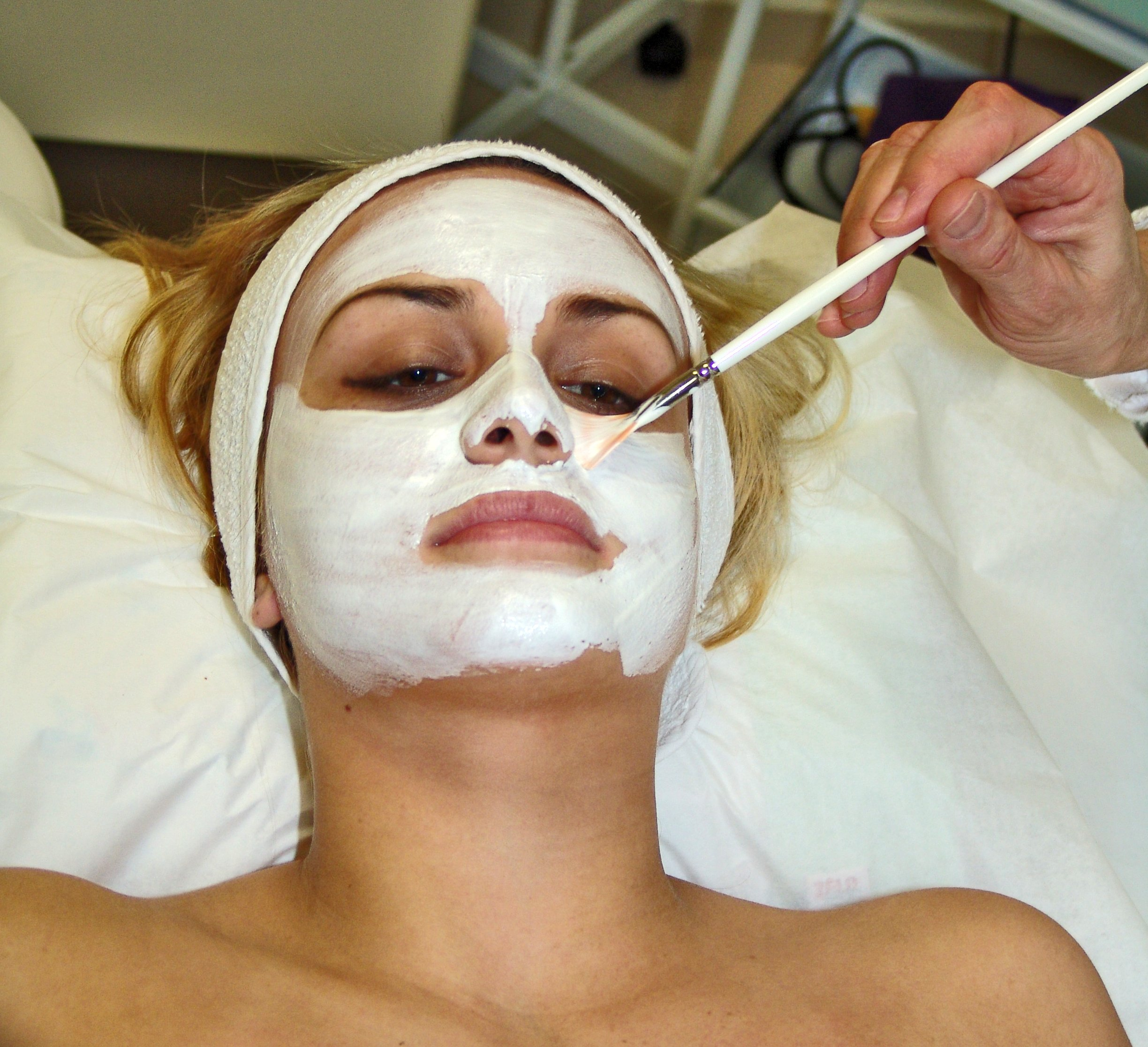
Facials may include the use of a facial mask.

A facial is a recommended, therapeutic practice that can be very beneficial to the skin. Typically, a facial is a multi-step process using different types, tools, and facial procedures depending on each person, and the skincare treatments provided. Different treatments can include steam facials, exfoliation (physical and chemical), extraction, creams, lotions, facial masks, peels, and massage. Facial treatments are uniquely tailored to every individual, due to people having different skin types, sensitivities, preferences, religious beliefs, and more. Types of facials include European facials,[1]LED light therapy facials, hydra-facials, and mini facials.

== History ==
As societies grew to become more complex, the demand for practices focused on physical appearance increased. Similar to modern society, ancient civilizations placed importance on appearance and aesthetics, so they developed various methods of maintaining and enhancing physical beauty. The term “cosmetic” originated from the Greek word cosmetikos, meaning to “arrange” or “to order”. The term was then used by ancient Romans to describe the practice of bathing—where enslaved workers provided body treatments—but it evolved into its modern use to describe products and practices intended for the beautification of the body.

The use of cosmetics and skincare products dates back thousands of years, with ancient civilizations developing their own methods of maintaining healthy and youthful-looking skin. As early as 3000 B.C.E., ancient Egyptians were particularly concerned with hair loss and developing facial wrinkles. So, they created facial ointments using ingredients such as wax, incense, fresh olive oil, and ground cypress bark, which were mixed and applied to the skin, in hopes to address this concern. Other natural substances, including honey, milk, and natron, were also used in body treatments to maintain skin hydration. By 2000 B.C.E., Mesopotamia had become a major trading center for spices and plants, many of which were incorporated into cosmetics, facial makeup, and skincare ointments. The use of natural ingredients continued from 500 B.C.E. through the Middle Ages, with substances such as tea oils, rice powders, sour milk, and various herbs being used in cosmetic preparations. Although the ingredients and techniques varied across regions, each civilization relied on its locally available plants, minerals, and natural resources to develop cosmetic products suited to its beauty practices.

Following the fall of the Roman Empire, Islamic medicine started influencing the development of cosmetics and skincare practices. Between the 9th and 12th centuries, Arab physicians developed facial treatments using natural ingredients, including a facial mask known as batikha, which was made from crushed rice, grain, seashells, and other exfoliating materials. Other “products” included almond oil cleansers, aromatic ointments, and rosewater-based lotions used for skincare. During the Renaissance, cosmetic practices continued to evolve alongside medicine, with natural ingredients such as aloe and artichokes being recommended to prevent hair loss, while wine vinegar to treat facial wrinkles. At times, harmful substances such as mercury and lead-based facial makeup were used in some practices to help achieve the desirable pale complexion.

During the 16th century in the Americas, the Maya and Aztec civilizations also showed practice of cosmetic procedures. They prepared lotions to soothe the skin by boiling seeds of etzapanxihuitl and used avocado, ahuacatlli, or sugar cane as a facial mask. In Europe during the 17th century, perfumers in Paris made ointments to treat facial wrinkles, made with apples which contain malic acid and alpha-hydroxy acid. Self-styled beauty specialists started attracting customers, mainly upper class women, by advertising their abilities to smooth skin, create beauty, take away wrinkles, making the face look like the most clear waters. By the 19th century, cosmetic products started being sold in stores and by the 20th century modern, practical, and powerful innovations started dominating. Packaged products, skincare tools, and prepared makeup started being sold in stores and this trend continues today in a dramatic fashion. Today, we see medicine and cosmetology come closer to one another through shared technology and underlying sciences. New technologies are helping create innovative and effective products, economically developing the cosmetology industry through face masks, creams, ointments, serums, and services.

== Commonly Used Ingredients ==
The Journal of Cosmetic Dermatology (JCD) introduced face masks as one of the most commonly used cosmetic products in facial treatments. They are designed to promote skin health and improve its overall appearance. Face masks are available in several formulations, including sheet masks, peel-off masks, rinse-off masks, and hydrogels, each offering distinct benefits depending on its composition and active ingredients. The selection of ingredients varies according to the manufacturer and the intended purpose of the treatment.

=== Vitamins ===
Among the most frequently incorporated vitamins in facial formulations are vitamins A, C, and E. Vitamin A plays an important role in regulating keratinization and reducing acne, while vitamin E exhibits antioxidant and anti-inflammatory properties. Vitamin C has been shown to reduce the appearance of facial wrinkles, provide protection against ultraviolet (UV) radiation, and stimulate collagen synthesis. Vitamin C derivatives such as ascorbyl palmitate and magnesium ascorbyl have increased chemical stability compared to conventional ascorbic acid, which is why they are more frequently incorporated into pharmaceutical and cosmetic formulations.

=== Proteins ===
Proteins are also widely used in facial treatments due to their potential to enhance skin resilience and promote rejuvenation. Collagen, a major structural protein that is essential in maintaining skin strength and elasticity, decreases with age contributing to visible signs of aging. Therefore, many formulations of products used in facials incorporate collagen-derived peptides to support skin health and elasticity. Another highly used agent in facials are growth factors (GFs). Growth factors are proteins naturally found in our body that signal cell repair, division and production of more proteins like elastin or collagen. The GF must enter through the cell’s lipid membrane, and technologies required to properly deliver this material into the cell are expensive, making access to products containing GFs also very pricey.

=== Herbs and Minerals ===
Beyond chemical elements, herbal ingredients have recently been highly regarded in facial treatments, specifically due to their historical and traditional significance. These substances provide essential nutrients for healthy skin, containing anti-inflammatory and antioxidant properties. Some examples include aloe vera, red rice bran, green tea, and parsley. Herbal ingredients have a higher risk of side effects due to allergens. Other naturally sourced ingredients include minerals such as clay, zinc oxide, sulfur, copper, and silver. These can be used in facials too, as they enhance skin uniformity and moisture through their anti-fungal and antimicrobial properties.

== Physiological Effects ==
A 2018 study published in Complementary Therapies in Medicine examined both short- and long-term effects of using a facial massage roller on facial skin blood flow and vascular reactivity. In an experiment involving 12 participants, short-term circulation was measured through five minutes of facial roller massage, and results indicated an increase in blood flow to the treated cheek lasting at a minimum of 10 minutes post-treatment. A separate experiment with 14 participants found that after five weeks of daily facial roller use, participants had increased blood vessel dilation in response to heat stimulation. These findings suggest facial massage rollers may produce short-term and long-term changes in localized vascular tissue.[1]

Similarly, a 2022 article published in the Journal of Cosmetic Dermatology examined online health claims by analyzing Google search results and existing scientific literature on facial massage techniques and tools, including the gua sha and jade roller. The authors identified commonly reported physiological benefits among these studies, including improved localized blood circulation, reduced muscle tension and increased lymphatic drainage. Although some studies have demonstrated short-term increases in facial skin blood flow, reduced puffiness and improved skin appearance, evidence remains limited. The authors highlight that further research is required to establish the physiological benefits of facial massage long-term.

To compliment the article Journal of Cosmetic Dermatology, the 2023 book Gua-sha, Jade Roller, and Facial Massage: Are there benefits within Dermatology, “Gua-sha, Jade Rollers, and facial massages are alternative treatments that improve blood flow and lymphatic drainage resulting in clearer skin.” This illustrates the positive effects and outcomes of using tools like the gua sha and jade roller.

A 2023 study published in the International Journal of Cosmetic Science examined whether facial skincare treatments involving massage provide physiological benefits. The study compared 32 women who received a one-hour facial treatment performed by a trained aesthetician to 31 women who rested for an equivalent one-hour period. Physiological relaxation was assessed through changes in brain activity, heart rate variability, respiratory rate and muscular tension. [1]

Both groups exhibited physiological relaxation; however, greater change was observed among participants receiving facial skincare treatments. Compared with an equivalent rest period, the facial treatment was associated with a 42% increase in cerebral relaxation, assessed through the alpha/beta brainwave ratio measured using electroencephalography (EEG), and 13% greater cardiac relaxation measured through heart rate variability (HRV). Respiratory relaxation, measured through respiratory rate, was 12% greater in the facial treatment group, as was muscular relaxation in the trapezius muscle, measured using electromyographic activity (EMG), at 17% greater than the relaxation group. [1]

Research suggests that the observed physiological changes may involve increased parasympathetic nervous system activity associated with rest and relaxation. It is important to consider that these physiological responses may reflect only short-term benefits.[1]

== Psychological Effects ==
Facial treatments may provide psychological benefits, particularly by promoting relaxing, enhancing mood, and reducing stress. Research suggests that facial treatments, especially those involving massage, can positively influence emotional well being and physiological relaxation responses. Emotional well being encompasses the personal abilities to regulate emotions as well as being in an overall positive affective state. A 2008 study involving 32 women tested the impact of facial massages on anxiety and negative mood status. The researchers used 2 questionnaires, having participants complete them both at baseline and after the facial treatment. They used the POMS-short form to record current mood state, as well as the STAI-20; a scale to measure anxiety levels. The scales measure consist of likert scales, measuring tension and anxiety, depression and dejection, anger, fatigue, hostility, and confusion. The participants rated their current state on a scale of 0 to 4, with 0 being the absence of the mood, and 4 being feeling the mood state to an extreme. It was found that a 45 minute facial massage significantly reduced participants’ reported anxiety and negative mood status, suggesting short-term effects on the stress and relaxation.

The 2023 study examining both the physiological and emotional effects of facial treatments published in the International Journal of Cosmetic Science, found advantageous effects of well being associated with facial treatments. When comparing a group who underwent a facial treatment versus a group who only rested, researchers found that the facial group displayed greater positive emotional responses, such as enjoyment and pleasantness. These effects were assessed through examinations of vocal characteristics associated with emotional states, as well as the participants descriptions of their facial experience. The researchers additionally identified relaxation and pleasure as the most prominent positive emotions associated with facial skincare treatments. Their finding suggests that facial treatments may contribute to hedonic well being, which is a type of well being that is characterized by immediate pleasure and emotional positivity.

Facials may work most prominently on well being to provide relaxation and temporary emotional relief. More research is needed to determine the long term and sustained effects of facial treatments, as well as a breakdown as to whether different types of facial treatments are associated with different emotions and psychological reactions.

== Risks ==
Published in the Journal of Cutaneous and Aesthetic Surgery, a 2020 study examined 102 patients who developed dermatological complications following various beauty parlour procedures. Individuals showed a 25.4% increase in acneiform eruptions and a 15.7% exacerbation of existing acne following facial treatments. Acneiform eruptions were associated with gold, herbal, de-tan and fruit facials, specifically developing within 2-4 weeks post-treatment. Gold facials were shown to increase facial hyperpigmentation by 14.7%. The authors suggest that obstruction of the pilosebaceous duct may trigger an inflammatory response in facial tissue, leading to these complications. As a result, facial treatments should be used with caution in patients with underlying skin conditions.

A 2008 study analyzing 142 women undergoing facial massages with the use of facial cream and/or steaming published by The International Journal of Dermatology found both immediate and delayed effects in approximately one third of the participants. Ingredients and components used in these facials consisted of standard, herbal, and exotic creams, as well as steaming gadgets, hot towels, and face packs. The most common side effect associated with the facial treatments was transient erythema and puffiness (36.1%) forming within 15 minutes to 2 hours of the treatment, lasting for approximately 2 hours. 33.1% developed acneiform eruptions within 3-10 weeks after the facial treatment. Acneiform eruptions were associated with lesions on the cheeks in some individuals, which took a lengthy period of time to heal, resulting in hyperpigmentation. It was noted that 34 of those individuals had a history of acneiform eruptions development after every past facial massage they had. More research on acneiform eruption scarring is needed as mixed conclusions have been found among studies. A smaller percentage of individuals developed lasting persistent erythema (7.1%), and dermatitis (4.7%). “Off the shelf” creams, facial steaming, and irritation from touching are risk factors to consider in the context of facials.

== Facials and Femininity in the Beauty Industry ==
The quantity of beautification services has increased significantly in the 21st century due to capitalism and its sociological relationship with physical aesthetics. An emphasis on visual aesthetics has been linked with femininity, causing women to seek facial services to align with social norms. The market is able to expand as consumers are faced with the insecurity that they are not feminine enough, as their face may not portray the standard of beauty perpetuated by online media.

=== Anti-Aging ===
Femininity is also targeted by the facial industry through the idea of anti-aging. It is ideal for people to maintain a lively face with supple, smooth skin well into their adult life. The global beautification market benefits from the fear of aging, selling facial products that target anti-wrinkling and anti-aging. More of these facial products have been selling because of online trends, overall emphasis of visual wellbeing, and the increase of global life expectancy. Higher life expectancies in recent centuries have caused people to witness how their features change with maturation. Aging can specifically target women as there is a natural masculinization of the face that occurs from the thinning of the eyebrows, lips, and depletion of the overall facial volume. Beyond just visual aesthetics, aging can directly cause skin to produce less of the vitamins it needs, leading people to supplement these deficits with facials.

=== Globalization of Beauty Standards ===
All of the aforementioned factors drive the beauty industry. In fact, in 2010 the beautification industry was valued at up to 400 billion dollars, particularly fuelled by a woman’s desire to increase her femininity. Social standards connected to visual aesthetics prevail to this degree because of the assumption that exterior beauty reflects the inner. Therefore, people want to optimize their physical appearance so others will also consider their inner personality. These various beauty standards are proliferated on social media, consequently causing a global idea of attractiveness. As a result, different cultures are considering the same types of faces as beautiful, leading to a globalization of the facial industry. Hence, different people around the world resort to the same facials assuming it will lead to the same results.

== See also ==
- Spa treatment
- Acne
- Skin care
