= The Informationist =

2011 crime novel by Taylor Stevens

- First edition
- Author: Taylor Stevens
- Language: English
- Series: Vanessa Michael Munroe
- Genre: Thriller novel
- Publisher: Crown Publishing Group
- Publication date: 2011
- Publication place: United States
- Media type: Print
- ISBN: 978-0307717092
- Followed by: The Innocent

The Informationist, by Taylor Stevens, is the first novel in the Vanessa Michael Munroe series, about a young woman raised in Cameroon as the daughter of American missionaries. She has a life-changing experience at the age of 14 when she takes up with an infamous gunrunner and his mercenary crew. Later in life she becomes a dealer of information, sort of a private eye for the 21st century, where she works for governments and corporations dealing in the specialized information of Central Africa.

The book has been translated into Italian, Spanish, Hebrew, Polish, Turkish and Dutch.

== Reception ==
Reviews often compared Stevens's Vanessa Michael Munroe to Stieg Larsson's Lisbeth Salander, in part due to their "feral, take-no-prisoners attitude." Booklist's Don Crinklaw noted that neither character is "a guy in a girl suit but not one to whimper in the corner, either." Sarah Weinman, writing for the Los Angeles Times, said Munroe and Salander "are lone wolves who, if they ever had a chance to meet, might discover they are really part of the same hunting pack."

In a starred review, Publishers Weekly called The Informationist a "blazingly brilliant debut."

Crinklaw called the novel "intriguing," saying, "The maneuvers at the end are dazzling, worthy of patience with the puzzling middle, and a tad reminiscent of Sherlock Holmes’ matter of the Copper Beeches."

Weinman further indicated that Stevens "writes with the confidence of one who knows she’s hit on a winning series character who has the world at her beck and call — and, perhaps, a growing legion of fans too."

Library Journal also reviewed the novel.

== Awards and honors ==
The Informationist reached the top ten of The New York Times Best Seller list.

Awards for The Informationist
Year	Award	Result	Ref.
2012	Anthony Award for Best First Novel	Finalist	
2012	Barry Award for Best First Novel	Winner	
2012	Macavity Award for Best First Mystery	Finalist	

== Film adaptation ==
In October 2012, James Cameron's production company Lightstorm Entertainment picked up film rights to the book with plans for Cameron to direct the adaptation for 20th Century Fox. The film is said to begin shooting after Cameron finishes the second and third installments of his Avatar series.
