= 2009 swine flu pandemic in Japan =

H1N1 in Japan: Confirmed cases Deaths with confirmed infections

The 2009 Japan flu pandemic was an outbreak of the H1N1 and the Influenza A viruses across Japan. The World Health Organization raised the pandemic alert for influenza to level 4 in April 2009 following a worldwide outbreak of the H1N1 influenza strain. The first Japanese infections of H1N1 and Influenza A were both recorded early in May 2009. In August 2009, the government estimated that the virus strains had infected about 760,000 people. At the height of the pandemic in October 2009, it was estimated that 20% of the Japanese population had been infected and that there were on average more than 20 infected people in each Japanese medical facility. The Ministry of Health, Labor and Welfare reported 198 deaths as of March 30, 2010. Japan put several measures in place to attempt to control the spread of infection including quarantining air travellers entering Japan who were suspected of having the virus and closing schools in areas of Japan with high numbers of infection. The pandemic ended in August 2010 when the World Health Organization announced that worldwide influenza infection number were back to the seasonal average before the outbreak occurred.

== Government reaction ==
In April, Japan's Ministry of Agriculture, Forestry and Fisheries instructed animal quarantine offices across the country to examine any live pigs being brought into the country to double-check for infection by the H1N1 strain of influenza. Japanese Agriculture Minister Shigeru Ishiba appeared on TV to reassure consumers regarding the safety of pork. The Japanese farm ministry said that it would not ask for restrictions on pork imports because pork was unlikely to be contaminated with the virus, and any virus would be killed in the cooking process anyway.

== Timeline ==
=== April ===
April 28

- Following the World Health Organization's raising the pandemic alert level to Phase 4 (April 27 UTC), Japan's Health, Labour, and Welfare Minister, Yoichi Masuzoe, declared the outbreak of a new influenza strain in Mexico, the United States, and Canada. A task force was set up. The Japanese government installed a basic policy to block the virus at borders. At Narita Airport, in-flight quarantine inspection was initiated to check the health of passengers arriving from Mexico, the United States, and Canada.

April 30

- At Narita, a Japanese woman tested positive for influenza A on a flight from LA (but was found to be infected with the Hong Kong strain of influenza A, not with H1N1).

==== May ====
May 1

- Another suspected case was announced by Health, Labour, and Welfare Minister in a 17-year-old male Yokohama high school student, who had tested positive for influenza A the day earlier. He turned out to have the Soviet strain of influenza A.

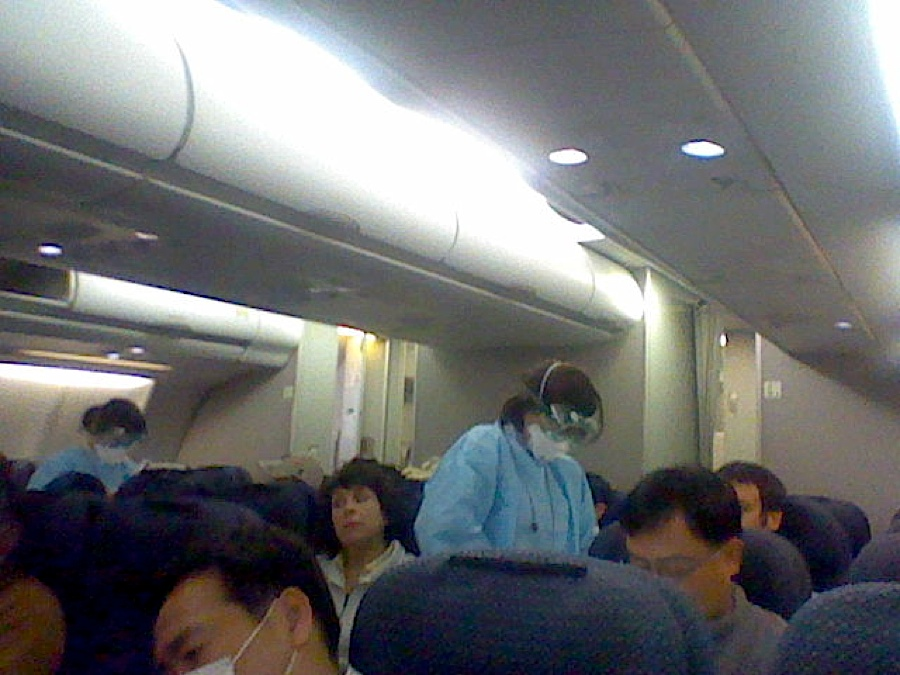
Health officials check airline passengers before allowing disembarkation of an international flight back to Japan.

May 8

- The first three cases of H1N1 in Japan were confirmed in patients who had spent time in Oakville, Canada and returned via Detroit.

May 10

- A fourth case was confirmed in a student who had returned from a school trip to Canada.

May 16

- Japan's first domestic case of infection was confirmed in Kobe in a male high school student without a history of traveling abroad. He was initially thought to have a seasonal flu, and therefore a Polymerase chain reaction (PCR) test had not been performed on him in a timely manner. Two other students were suspected, and 17 other students claimed flu-like symptoms, but the route of the infection was not traceable.
- An emergency meeting was held in Kobe, and the decision was made to close public schools and kindergartens in several wards--Higashinada, Nada, Chūō—and in a neighboring city, Ashiya, for seven days. The annual Kobe Festival, planned for that day and the next, was cancelled.
- The number of confirmed high school cases in Kobe reached 8 by nightfall, many were members of the same volleyball club who had recently competed in an inter-scholastic match. In Osaka prefecture, one high school student tested positive, her sample having been sent to the Infectious Disease Surveillance Center. Other 100 students at the same school and some of their family members exhibited flu-like symptoms.
- Based on the prefectural plan of measures against new flu, Hyōgo Prefecture declared a state of emergency. Schools in Hyogo, Kita, and Nagata wards were closed for one week.

World Health Organization regions

May 17

- 161 people were reported to have been in close contact with the infected students in Hyōgo Prefecture only.
- Masaro Kaji, an honorary professor at Kurume University, warned "There is a possibility of the H1N1 flu spreading among areas of frequent human traffic other than in the Kansai region, like Tokyo.
- The overall confirmed toll reached 56, including four cases discovered at Narita Airport in passengers returning from Canada.

May 18

- In Hyōgo and Osaka prefectures, elementary, junior high and senior high schools were closed for a week.
- By evening, confirmed cases in Japan totaled 144: 140 domestic cases from Hyōgo and Osaka Prefectures, and four other cases found during quarantine inspection.
- Domestic cases include employees of a railway kiosk and a bank; therefore, several railway kiosks in Kobe were closed and 70 other bank workers who had worked with an infected employee were told to stay home.

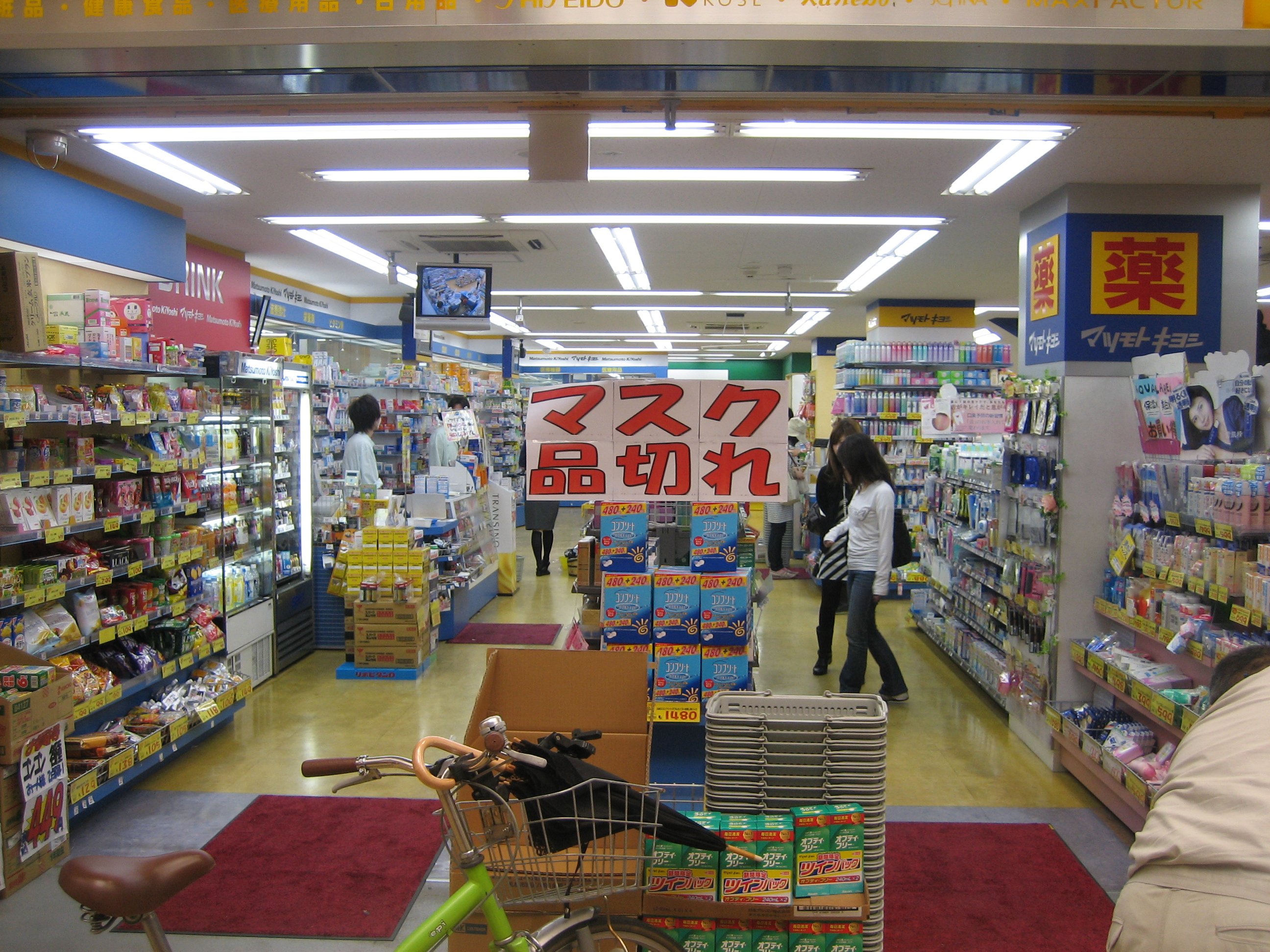
Surgical masks selling out in Hyōgo Prefecture due to Influenza A H1N1 2009 swine flu outbreak (H1N1 Flu)

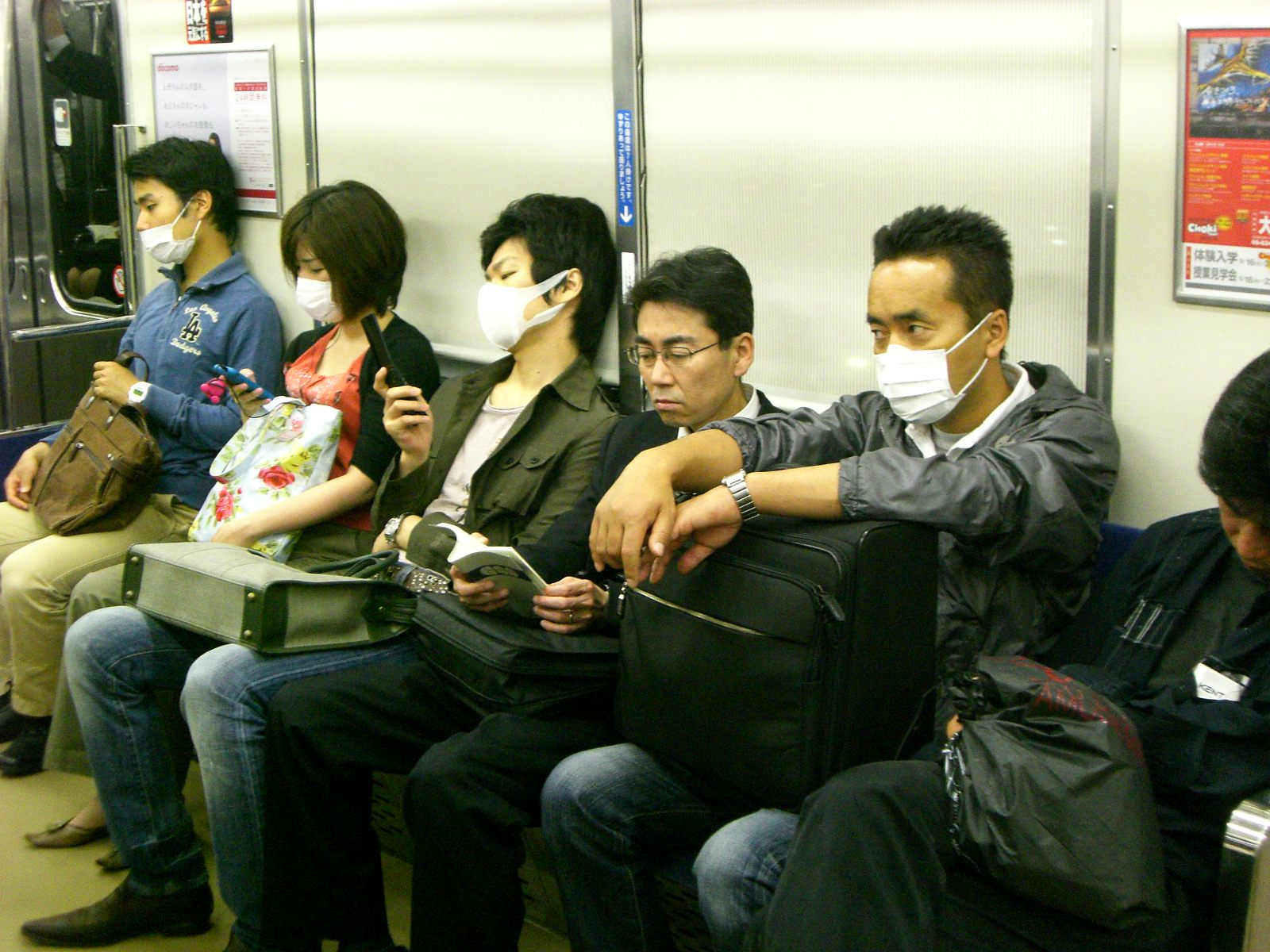
Due to fears of contracting the novel flu, some commuters on Osaka Loop Line wore surgical masks.

May 19

- According to Osaka's educational committee, about 2400 students among 198,000 left, and 19,000 reported symptoms including sore throat, nasal congestion, and fever.
- Tonooka Tatsuhito, former chief of the city of Otaru's public health center, reported "Because clinical presentation of novel flu and seasonal flu show the same symptoms, there is a possibility that unaware of novel flu, patients have been treated at ordinary clinic as if they had seasonal flu," and that "this time, a doctor of Kobe submit sample (of first confirmed male high school student who never went abroad and didn't even have fever at that time) by chance, so it was recognized as novel flu. The infection is not only a problem of Kansai area."
- To avoid false positive reporting, the Health, Labour and Welfare Ministry added to the diagnostic criteria for the novel flu that a patient have a record of overseas travel but Tokyo metropolitan changed its policy to detect early stage novel flu and perform inspection even if no record of travel abroad existed.

May 20

- Shiga Prefecture became the third prefecture to report infection: a 23-year-old man in Ōtsu.
- Tokyo Prefecture and Kanagawa Prefecture's Kawasaki city each announced their first confirmed cases in two 16-year-old high school girls, one living in Hachiōji in west Tokyo, and the other in Kawasaki. They went to the same Kawasaki high school and had traveled together from the United States, where they had attended a mock session of the United Nations. Although the student from Hachioji developed a fever during the flight, she tested negative to preliminary testing for influenza A and B at Narita airport, according to Tokyo officials.
- Confirmed cases in Japan reached 267 that day: 263 domestic cases from Hyōgo, Osaka, Shiga, Tokyo and Kanagawa prefectures, and four other cases found during quarantine inspection.

May 21

- Kawasaki city apologized to national media at the Kawasaki press club for hiding their suspected case, saying the student's family hoped the case would not be made public until confirmed. The day prior, Kawasaki knew that she had tested positive in a simple test, but denied this fact in media inquiries, until they confirmed the case in a public announcement later that night.
- Tokyo announced its second confirmed case: a 36-year-old woman living in Meguro ward, who returned to Japan on May 19 after traveling to Florida and San Francisco, California, for about two weeks.
- Nara prefecture announced that of 1117 junior and senior high school students and faculty members who had fever and coughs, all had been interviewed by school doctors, seven of them visiting fever consultation clinics, and all had tested negative.
- Kyoto announced the first confirmed case its prefecture: a 10-year-old elementary-school boy.

May 22

- Saitama Prefecture announced its first confirmed case: a 29-year-old man of town of Washimiya, who travelled to Osaka and Kyoto on May 17 to May 19.
- By the morning of May 22, confirmed cases in Japan totaled 279: 275 domestic cases from Hyōgo (146), Osaka (123), Tokyo (2), Kanagawa (1), Saitama (1), Kyoto (1) and Shiga (1) prefectures, and four other cases found during quarantine inspection.
- Six days after the first domestic infection case was confirmed, the government implemented a new policy, revising its guidelines on battling the novel strain of H1N1. The new policy grouped areas of Japan into two categories, depending on the number of confirmed patients.
  - In areas already with high or sharply rising numbers of confirmed cases, more flexible measures were to be applied which focused on preventing patients from developing serious symptoms; priority would be placed on treating people with underlying health problems such as diabetes and asthma; local authorities would take initiative in dealing with outbreaks, and school lessons could be suspended on a school-by-school basis or on a class-by-class basis.
  - In areas with few or no cases confirmed, strict measures were to remain in place to prevent the spread of infection; all infected patients would be hospitalized at medical institutions designated to treat cases of infectious diseases; Nearby schools or, those in a location at risk for spreading the virus, would be asked to suspend lessons.
- The government also called off blanket in-flight quarantine inspections on aircraft arriving from Mexico, the United States and Canada.
- Tokyo's third case was confirmed: a 25-year-old man from Mitaka who was in Osaka from May 14 to May 20.
- Another case was confirmed during quarantine inspection at Narita: a South Korean man who arrived from Chicago on May 21.

May 23

- Nursery schools and day care facilities reopened in Hyōgo Prefecture.
- The number of newly confirmed domestic cases had been declining since May 20, according to a data report released on May 23 from the Ministry of Health, Labour and Welfare.
- In preparation for resumption of school on May 25, teachers in a Kobe municipal high school made masks of folded paper-towels, for students who couldn't bring in their own due to low supply at stores.

May 24

- The sixth quarantine case was confirmed at Narita: a 41-year-old Japan Airlines ground crewman, who had been on a business trip to Seattle and then arrived at Narita Airport from Vancouver on May 24.
- Confirmed cases in Japan reached 343 that day: 337 domestic cases and six other cases found during quarantine inspection.

May 25

- Most schools in Osaka and Hyōgo Prefectures resume.
- Fukuoka Prefecture announced the first confirmed case in Kyushu region: a U.S. citizen who visited his wife's parents' home.

May 26

- Shizuoka announced the first confirmed case from Shizuoka Prefecture: a seven-year-old boy who returned from the Philippines on May 22.
- Two U.S. nationals were confirmed ill on May 26 during quarantine inspection: a man and his child who arrived at Narita on May 25.
- By 9:30 PM that night, there were 353 confirmed cases in Japan, including one from Shizuoka prefecture and eight cases that had been found during quarantine inspection.

May 27

- First confirmed case in Wakayama Prefecture: a 28-year-old man who returned from a trip to Hawaii on May 23.
- Two out of four new cases in Kobe were students of high schools that had been closed until May 24; The schools suspend classes for an additional week.
- Shizuoka announced another confirmed case: a younger sister of the first confirmed boy.
- By the evening, confirmed cases in Japan numbered 364, 356 domestic cases and eight cases found during quarantine inspection.

May 28

- 367 confirmed cases by the evening.
- The Mayor of Kobe held a press conference saying "[The spread of the novel H1N1 virus] seems to have ceased in the city. I send a message that Kobe is safe in the meantime. Please visit Kobe." The chairman of the city's medical association scoffed that it was too early to make such an announcement, that the mayor should have waited for at least seven consecutive days to pass with no new cases.

May 29

- 370 confirmed cases, three of the new cases are male high school students from Kobe, Nishinomiya and Kakogawa.
- Train crews and employees of JR West and Kansai stop wearing masks. Japan Airlines and All Nippon Airways also lifted their mask-wearing requirements at Kobe's airport and onboard flights going the North American route. The Kinki area baseball league decided to cancel the spring Kinki rubber-ball baseball tournament because the number of infected patients was still increasing.
- The National Institute of Infectious Diseases and the National Institute of Technology and Evaluation announced that the spread of novel H1N1 in the Kansai area was considered caused by the same strain of the virus, after having analyzed strains in four patients in Osaka and five patients in Hyōgo Prefectures. Two cases involved strains were genetically identical, and the seven others each had a difference of one or two mutated genes. It was found by this time that this strain was different from the one originally found at the Narita quarantine on May 8.

May 30

- First confirmed case in Chiba prefecture is announced. (Note: Although Narita Airport is in Chiba prefecture, the case found at quarantine is included as a Japanese domestic case, but not considered as a patient of Chiba.) in a 19-year-old female restaurant employee who works at a passenger-only area in Narita Airport and lives in a company dormitory in Sakura. She had not travelled abroad recently or visited the Kansai area. Chiba prefecture attempts to contact 200 of her associates and friends.
- 377 total national cases confirmed. Six new cases are from in Hyōgo and Osaka, and one from Chiba.

==== June ====
- June 10: Japan reported first case in Tottori city, Tottori Prefecture.

- June 11: Number of cases rises to 532, including 9 students at a Tokyo high school.

- June 26: Number of cases rises to 1049.

==== July ====
July 2

- The first case of oseltamivir-resistant virus in Asia was announced in Japan, in a woman who had been taking oseltamivir prophylactically.

July 24

- The number of cases exceeded 5000. The Health, Labour and Welfare Ministry stopped counting individual patients and moved to a "cluster control" phase, monitoring group infections at schools and working places. National Institute of Infectious Diseases stop updating laboratory confirmed cases.

==== August ====
August 15

- A 57-year-old man from Okinawa prefecture is the first person to die with the illness in Japan.

August 18

- A second 77-year-old man in Kobe city, Hyōgo Prefecture died. He had diabetes and had been undergoing dialysis.

August 19

- A third person, an 81-year-old woman in Nagoya city, Aichi Prefecture dies. She had myeloma multiplex and cardiac failure.
- The Minister of Health, Labor and Welfare repeated his warnings.

August 21

- IDSC (Infectious Disease Surveillance Center) estimates 110,000 new flu patients increased during the week of August 10 to 16. After Mid-July, most of detected influenza type is AH1pdm. IDSC declared flu outbreak.

August 26

- A 74-year-old woman died of pneumonia in Nagoya city reported as 4th death in Japan. She was not PCR tested, but simple test resulted in type A influenza and three other patient in the hospital had been confirmed as novel flu. She had no underlying diseases.

August 27

- A fifth person, a man of 30s died of pneumonia in Nagano city, Nagano Prefecture. He had an enlarged heart, chronic heart failure and diabetes.

August 28

- Ministry of Health, Labour and Welfare announced estimated and assumable number that approximately 760,000 people to be infected and 46,400 to be hospitalized per day in peak time frame of October 2009, 20% of total Japanese infected in country wise and 30% in city area.

August 29

- The 6th death occurred in Kagoshima Prefecture. A woman in her 60s had cancer in digestive system and lungs, considered to be high-risk against infection.
- The 7th death linked to new flu in Japan occurred. A 38-year-old woman in Hyōgo Prefecture has epilepsy and commuting to welfare facility but considered no underlying disease. On 27th, she get high fever of 39 degrees and next day she had simple test and diagnosed as type A, treated with oseltamivir, and rest in her home but her condition suddenly changed early in the morning of 29th, and confirmed dead at 4 AM. After her death, PCR test was performed and confirmed to be novel flu. Her direct reason for death is unknown.
- A 5-year-old boy in Shiga Prefecture, confirmed the fifth oseltamivir resistant patient in Japan. Although he was given oseltamivir, high fever continued. Now he recovered and ex-hospital.

August 30

- The 8th death occurred in Hokkaidō Prefecture was the first death as health worker. A woman in her 40s died after contracting the flu, although the immediate cause of death was acute heart failure and it has not been determined if the flu contributed to her death. She was responsible person of researching group infection of junior high school in Rishiri town. She had high blood pressure, but no underlying disease.

==== September ====
September 1

- The 9th death occurred in Kōchi Prefecture. A man in his 70s who had diabetes and obstructive lung disease. He was diagnosed A positive by a simple test, but linkage to the death is unknown.

September 2

- The 10th death occurred in Kizugawa city, Kyoto Prefecture. A 69-year-old man died of fulminant myocarditis. He had chronic heart and lung disease. The Prefectural government announced that flu might have caused his myocarditis.
- A group infection rise of 1,330 for August 24 to 30, a 1.5-fold of previous week. Group infections have been increasing for five consecutive weeks.

September 6

- The 11th presumable death from H1N1 in Japan occurred. A 90-year-old man in Kami District, Miyagi Prefecture who had nontuberculous mycobacterium. He had a fever on August 30; type-A positive by simple test was confirmed, so he was prescribed oseltamivir but died. His direct cause of death was worsening of pneumonia. By PCR test, novel flu was not confirmed.

September 9

- The 12th death occurred in Osaka Prefecture. A 45-year-old with no underlying diseases was prescribed oseltamivir and his fever went down, but his family found him unconscious. Confirmed as novel flu and the direct cause of death was ischemic heart disease.

September 10

- The 13th death occurred in Aomori Prefecture. A man in his 90s came down with a fever of 41.2 degree and was diagnosed A-positive by a simple test. He was prescribed oseltamivir and his fever went down, but he was confirmed dead on September 10. His direct cause of death was acute pneumonia. He had been bedridden by the aftereffects of a stroke and frequently suffered aspiration pneumonia.

September 15

- The 14th death occurred in Haebaru town, Shimajiri district, Okinawa Prefecture. A 24-year-old who had no underlying disease. On August 26, she was diagnosed as Type-A at a local clinic and prescribed Zanamivir and was sent back home. On August 31, she was diagnosed with acute viral pneumonia and it was confirmed to be related to novel influenza A, at which point she was immediately taken into intensive-care unit but died. Her direct cause of death was subarachnoid bleeding by using respirator and external ventricular assist device.

September 17

- The 15th death occurred in Yokohama city, Kanagawa Prefecture. A 12-year-old who had bronchial asthma. On September 2, he developed a fever of 39 degrees with vomiting. A simple test for the flu was negative but he was taken to another clinic to treat his bronchial asthma. His fever went down to 37 degrees so he returned home. On September 3, his fever rose to 40 degrees and he was diagnosed as having myocarditis, taken into the intensive-care unit but the result of a second simple test was also negative. On September 10, a blood test showed a type-A positive. On September 14, Yokohama municipal health laboratory confirmed his case as the new strain of flu. His direct cause of death was subarachnoid bleeding.

September 20

- The 16th death occurred in Kurume, Fukuoka Prefecture. A woman in her 60s died. The 17th death occurred in Kobe.Japan: 16th and 17th swineflu death in Kurume and Kobe

September 21

- The 18th death occurred in Moriyama city, Shiga Prefecture. A 7-year-old boy who had a history of periodic fever syndrome, but the link between his death is unknown. On the 18th, he was healthy and commuting to his elementary school. On the 19th, in the morning, he had a fever of 38 degrees and cough, prescribed paracetamol at a clinic. Next day his temperature raised to 40.6 degrees, went into convulsions and was determined type-A positive by a simple test. He was transferred to another hospital and prescribed oseltamivir but fell unconscious. Suspected of having acute viral encephalitis, he was taken into the ICU of Shiga University of Medical Science Hospital and attached to a respiratory system. His case was confirmed as novel flu by a genetic test. On the 21st his temperature went down to 34.6 and his blood pressure also went down. At 21:25 he died of viral encephalitis.

September 23

- The 19th death occurred in Kishiwada city, Osaka Prefecture. A 70-year-old woman who had the underlying complications of diabetes, high blood pressure, and leukemia. Her direct cause of death was influenza pneumonia.

September 25

- Tokyo Metropolitan government announced novel flu alert because average influenza patients per medical facility exceed 10.24. This means that there is the possibility of a major outbreak occurring within four weeks.

September 30

- The 20th death occurred in Kitakyūshū city, Fukuoka Prefecture. A 49-year-old man who had no underlying diseases. In mid September, he claimed to have breathing difficulties. On the 21st, he had a fever of 39.7 degrees and was diagnosed with pneumonia. A simple test was negative. On the 22nd, his condition was complicated by hepatic and kidney failure. He was taken to the ICU, but died. His direct cause of death was Multiple organ dysfunction syndrome (MODS). The case was confirmed as novel flu on October 1.

==== October ====
October 4

- The 21st death occurred in Sakai city, Osaka Prefecture. On September 29, a woman in her 40s with pre-existing high blood pressure developed a sore throat, cough, and fever. She was hospitalized on October 2. Simple tests had been negative three times but on October 3 she was prescribed oseltamivir, and PCR tested. Her condition suddenly changed the next day, with acute kidney failure and respiratory failure so she was taken into the ICU where she died. Her direct cause of death was MODS caused by high lethality catastrophic group A streptococcal infection. On October 5 PCR confirmed novel flu.

October 6

- The 22nd death occurred in Tokyo Metropolis. A 5-year-old with no underlying diseases developed a fever on October 2. The next day his temperature reached 40 degrees, he was diagnosed A-positive by simple test and prescribed oseltamivir. But after he was back home, he vomited, exhibited disordered consciousness, and developed a cramp so he was transported by emergency vehicle to a hospital. He lost consciousness and developed MODS. He was attached to a respiratory system. On October 5 he was confirmed to have novel flu and died the next day. His direct cause of death was viral encephalitis.

October 7

- The first human to human infection of oseltamivir resistant novel flu occurred. A teenager residing in Sapporo city, Hokkaidō prefecture was the 8th to have oseltamivir resistant swine influenza virus in Japan, but unlike the previous seven patients, she was never prescribed oseltamivir.

October 9

- The 23rd death occurred in Asahikawa city, Hokkaidō prefecture. A man in his 20s with the underlying diseases of asthma, diabetes and heart disease became feverish on October 6. The morning of October 8, family members found the man unconscious; at the hospital he was diagnosed type A positive. He suffered cardiac arrest, but was resuscitated and taken into the ICU, where he was attached to a respirator and dosed with oseltamivir. He died the same night.

October 13

- The 24th death was a 4-year-old boy in Tokyo. He had no underlying diseases. On October 4, he had a fever of 40 degrees. The next day a simple test showed type-A positive and he was subscribed oseltamivir. While en route home, he developed a cramp so was hospitalized. On October 6 he lost consciousness and suffered cardiac arrest. He never recovered. His direct cause of death was acute encephalitis.

October 14

- The 25th death was a 16-year-old male high school student in Kiyosu city, Aichi Prefecture. He had underlying bronchial asthma. He had a fever on October 11. The next day, he showed disordered consciousness so he was transported to a hospital. On October 3 he stopped breathing and died the next day. He was confirmed as having novel flu.
- The 26th death was an 8-year-old girl in Nishinomiya city, Hyōgo Prefecture. She had no underlying diseases. On October 12, she had a fever of nearly 39 degrees and rested at her home, but became unconscious in the evening. A test showed A-positive and she was hospitalized and attached to a respirator but she died. Her cause of death was MODS including viral encephalitis.

October 15

- The 27th death was a 5-year-old boy in Tsuzuki-ku, Yokohama city. He had no underlying diseases. He was feverish from the 12th. The next day a simple test showed A-positive, was given oseltamivir. In the night, he had respiratory problems, and was taken to the ICU but died of severe pneumonia and acute myocarditis.
- Yokohama city and Sagamihara city, Kanagawa Prefecture announced novel flu alert because the average number of influenza patients per medical facility is 24.89 in Yokohama, and 16.54 in Sagamihara.
- Sapporo city in Hokkaidō announced novel flu alert because the average number of influenza patients per medical facility in Sapporo is 51.66.

October 18

- The 28th death was a 36-year-old woman in Kawasaki city, Kanagawa Prefecture. She was residing in Tokyo but had underlying diseases (asthma and diabetes), regularly went to a hospital in the city. She showed cold like symptoms on October 10, had a fever on 11th. Visit hospital on 12th, showed breathing difficulty so she was immediately hospitalized and taken into ICU. She was confirmed as novel flu on 15th. Died of a severe pneumonia on October 18.

October 20

- The 29th death was a 3-year-old boy in Tokyo Metropolis. He had no underlying diseases. At the evening of October 19, he had a fever of 38.0 degree so went to a nearby clinic. Diagnosed as common cold and prescribed cough medicine. The next day, his temperature rise to 39.6 and diagnosed as type A positive by simple test, prescribed oseltamivir. At the night, his condition suddenly changed and became unconscious. When he was emergency transported to a hospital, he was already in cardiac arrest, confirmed dead and was novel flu. His cause of death is considered to be a viral encephalitis.
- The 30th death was a 51-year-old woman in Atsugi city, Kanagawa Prefecture. She had no underlying disease. On Cot 13, she had cough and fever. On October 19, she claimed loss of muscle strength of both legs and was hospitalized. On October 20 in the morning, she had breathing difficulty and pain in her chest, and died after changed hospital. Her cause of death was suspected to be acute myocarditis triggered by the infection.

October 21

- The Ministry of Agriculture, Forestry and Fisheries announced that a pig in Osaka Prefecture was infected. Osaka city requested that the farm not sell or move the pigs. In this case, human-to-animal transmission is suspected.

October 22

- The 31st death was a 67-year-old woman in Kawaguchi city, Saitama Prefecture. She had underlying diseases, diabetes, high blood pressure and stroke. She had a fever on October 3, was diagnosed as type-A influenza and given oseltamivir on October 6. The next day her temperature dropped but rose again on 8th, she was hospitalized having difficulty breathing. On the 14th, she was confirmed to have novel flu by PCR test. On October 22, her condition suddenly deteriorated and at 5 pm, she was confirmed as dead. Her cause of death was influenza pneumonia.

October 23

- The 32nd death was a man in his 50s in Fukui city, Fukui Prefecture. He had underlying diseases of diabetes, high blood pressure and stroke. He had cough and fever on September 27, visited Fukui Health and Welfare Center, and diagnosed as pneumonia. Although a simple test resulted negative, novel flu was considered from the symptoms so he was oseltamivir. On 30 his condition worsened and had a fever of 38.5 degree so taken into ICU. On October 1, confirmed as novel flu by PCR test. On October 11, he was attached to a respirator. Died October 23 at 5am. His cause of death was pneumonia.
- National Institute of Infectious Diseases estimated weekly first visit influenza patients increased to 830,000 more than the previous week. Average patients per medical facility were highest in Hokkaidō, (57.93) and Aichi Prefecture (31.78).

October 25

- The 33rd death was a 13-year-old female junior high school student in Iruma city, Saitama Prefecture. She had no underlying diseases. On October 22 she had a fever of 38.8 degree so she left school early, was prescribed zanamivir but fever didn't go down in next day and claimed pain in her chest. October 24 she was prescribed antipyretic. Later, she was repeatedly vomiting, and was emergency transported to a hospital, but confirmed dead at the hospital. Her cause of death was viral myocarditis.

October 26

- The 34th death was a man in his 80s in Nara city, Nara Prefecture. He had an underlying disease of diabetes. His suspected cause of death was a cardiovascular failure caused by sepsis.
- The 35th death was a woman in her 80s in Shijōnawate city, Osaka Prefecture. She had underlying diseases of chronic kidney disease. Her cause of death was sudden worsening of chronic kidney disease and pneumonia.

October 26

- The 36th death was a 57-year-old man in Ishinomaki city, Miyagi Prefecture. He had underlying diseases of diabetes and chronic kidney disease. His cause of death was heart failure and MODS.
- Yokohama city health and safety section announced that a 6-year-old boy confirmed to be infected oseltamivir resistant virus. First in Kanagawa Prefecture, 12th in Japan.

October 27

- The 37th death was a 63-year-old woman in Tokyo. She had an underlying disease, myocardial disease. Her cause of death was cardiac arrest.

October 29

- The 38th death was a man in his 20s in Uto city, Kumamoto Prefecture. On October 27 he had coughed; the next day he visited a medical facility. He had a fever of 39 degrees and was dehydrated. Simple test resulted negative, but his family member had novel flu, was prescribed oseltamivir. On the evening of October 29 he was found dying at his home. Genetic test confirmed he was novel flu. His cause of death and if he had underlying diseases is unknown.
- The 39th death was a 6-year-old girl in Sakai city, Osaka Prefecture. She had cerebral palsy. On the night of October 27, she had a fever of 37 degrees, and visited a clinic the next day. Simple test resulted in A-positive, she was prescribed oseltamivir and sent home. On the morning of October 29 she went into cardiorespiratory arrest and died.

October 30

- The 40th death was a 46-year-old man in Daitō city, Osaka Prefecture. He had no underlying diseases. He had a fever on October 28. The next day he visited a clinic and was prescribed Oseltamivir. Before dawn on October 30 he had delirium. His cause of death was acute pneumonia.

==== November 1 ====
- The 41st death was a 30-year-old woman in Ukyō ward, Kyoto Prefecture.
- A 2-year-old girl in Morioka city, Iwate Prefecture died.

==== December 2 ====
151 young flu patients have exhibited abnormal behavior such as depression and uttering gibberish.

== See also ==
- Swine influenza
- public health
- 2009 flu pandemic vaccine
- Flu season
