= Masked ball (disambiguation) =

A masked ball is a social event attended by participants wearing masks.

The term may also refer to:

- A Masked Ball, a Verdi opera
- Masked Ball, a 1918 Hungarian film
- The Masked Ball, an American play
- "Masked Ball" (Twin Peaks episode)
