= The Mask (Stevens novel) =

2015 thriller novel by Taylor Stevens

- Author: Taylor Stevens
- Series: Vanessa Michael Munroe
- Publisher: Crown Publishing Group
- Publication date: June 30, 2015
- Awards: Barry Award for Best Thriller (2016)
- ISBN: 9780385348966
- Preceded by: The Catch

The Mask is a 2015 thriller novel by Taylor Stevens, the fifth and final book in her Vanessa Michael Munroe series. It won the 2016 Barry Award for Best Thriller.

== Reception ==
Publishers Weekly called The Mask "underwhelming" and "slow-grinding," indicating that "The fight scenes, though well choreographed, seem at times like an afterthought, thrown in when the plot frequently stalls." Further, they found the setting to be "under utilized" as though the book "could be set anywhere." However, they cited Munroe as a highlight of the novel, noting that "her propensity for rage remains a believable part of this series as she mixes her intelligence with her extreme martial arts skills."

Kirkus Reviews agreed that "Stevens takes longer to develop the action than usual," though they conceded that "any Munroe is better than none at all."

Booklist and Library Journal also reviewed the novel.

== Awards and honors ==
The Mask won the 2016 Barry Award for Best Thriller.
