= Facial mask =

Pasted mask for facial cosmetic treatment

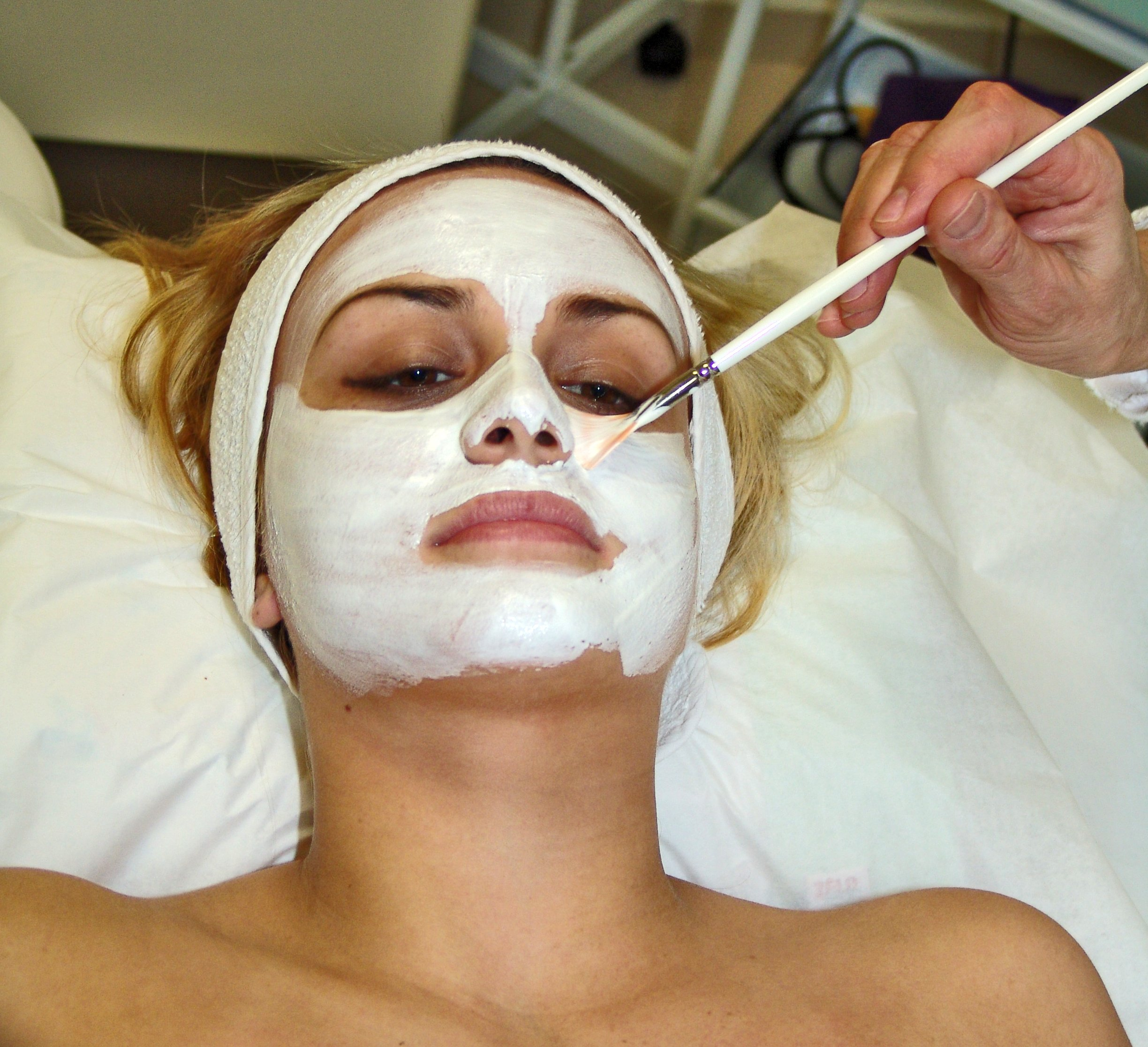
A woman wearing a facial mask.

A facial mask is a creamy or thick pasted mask applied to the face for cleansing or skin-smoothing purposes. Facial masks often contain minerals, vitamins, and fruit extracts, such as cactus and cucumber. A sheet mask is a piece of paper, cellulose or fabric used to apply a facial mask. LED facial masks use light to improve skin.

Facial masks were used by ancient Egyptian civilizations for aesthetic purposes and to treat specific skin conditions. In ancient Greece, herbal mixtures were used to improve skin texture and radiance. Herbal ingredients were also used in China and in India (via Ayurvedic practices), where herbs were mixed with natural clays to produce facial masks.

The first patent for a facial mask was in Ohio, United States, during the 19th century (1875) by Helen Rowley. It claimed to 'bleach, purify and preserve the complexion' of the skin. There are different kinds of masks for different purposes; some are deep cleansing for cleaning the pores. The effect of a facial mask treatment can be revitalizing, rejuvenating or refreshing. Some may provide tighter pores, increased skin clarity, and a reduction in facial skin wrinkles. Historically masks have been shown to be no more effective than other products, such as moisturizing creams and lotions.

Facial masks with hydrating and protective ingredients, can restore moisture, improve the skin barrier, and address signs of aging. Recent advancements include the use of biodegradable polymers, nanomaterials, and biomimetic technologies that can improve the up-take of active ingredients. Ingredients found in facial skin masks include hyaluronic acid, collagen, botanical extracts, and antioxidants, which have hydrating, rejuvenating, and protective effects.

Facial masks should be selected according to skin type. Clay and mud masks suit oily skin; cream-based masks work best on dry skin types. Masks should be used on cleansed skin for the best results. Some firming masks should not be applied to the eye area because they can cause irritation. Honey is a popular mask because it smooths skin and cleans pores. A popular home remedy includes a slice of cucumber on the eyes. Some masks also use pickle juice.

Polymers are used to produce sheet masks. Some people show a preference towards eco-friendly and bio-derived materials. Due to environmental concerns, particularly for products with a short life cycle, using bio-based polymers is preferable. Developments in the cosmetic industry include investigating the use of bio-based beauty masks, which use hydrophilic polymers such as polysaccharides and pullulan.

== LED facial masks ==
LED facial masks can help a number of facial skin issues, for acne blue light can be beneficial, whereas red light can stimulate collagen production and reduce hyperpigmentation. LED uses waves of light to brighten, firm and calm skin and can reduce signs of aging. LED is used within medicine for psoriasis, sun damage, acne and eczema. LED facial masks use photobiomodulation, which stimulates skin cells. At home LED facial masks are now widely available. Such devices can improve skin-brightening and anti-aging.

== See also ==
- Cleanser
- Facial
- Moisturizer
- Anti-aging cream
- Facial care
