= Skin care =

Range of practices that support skin integrity, health, and appearance

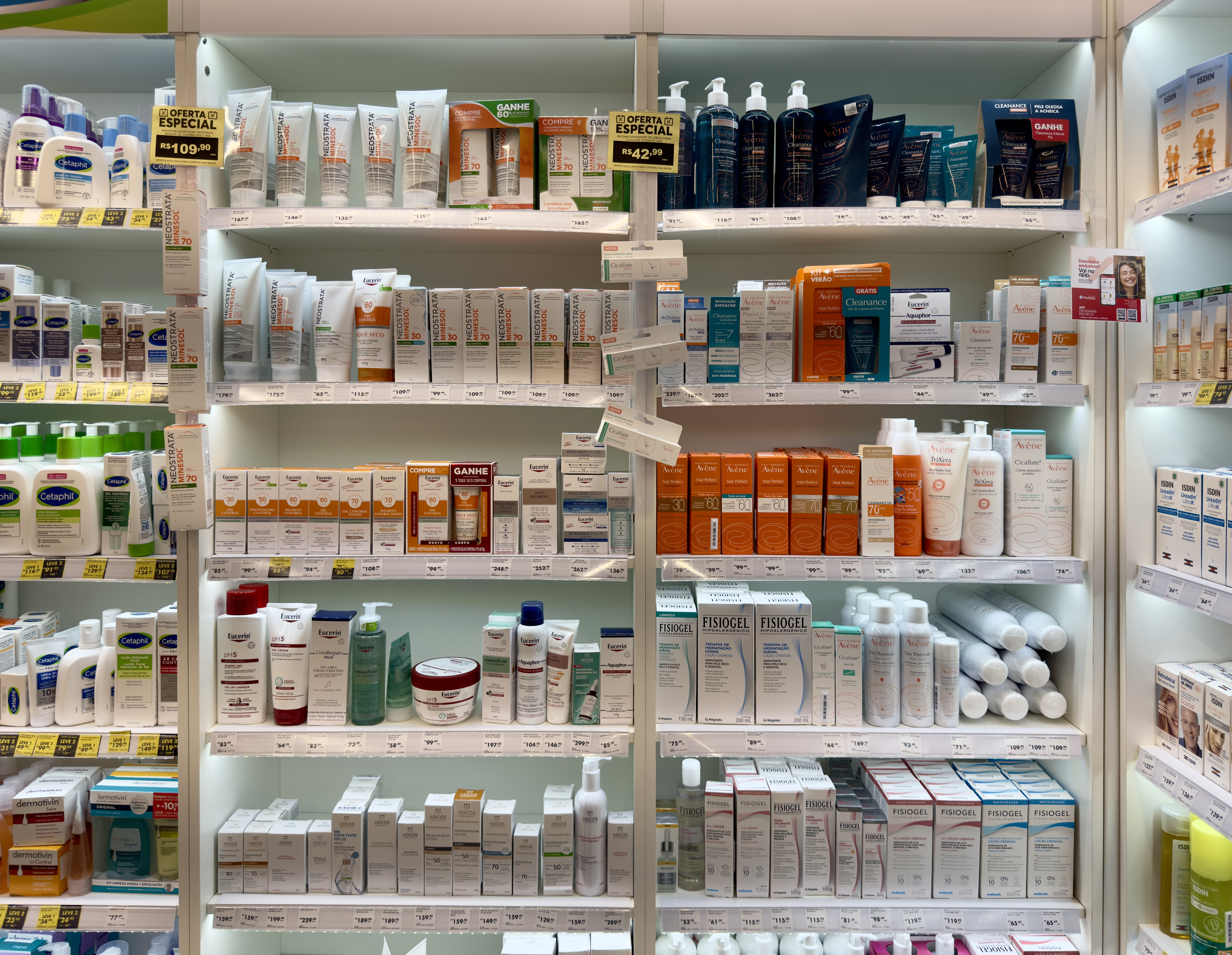
Skin care cosmetics at a pharmacy

Skin care or skincare is the practice and process of maintaining and improving the health and appearance of the skin. It includes washing, moisturizing, protecting from the sun, and treating skin problems like acne and dryness. Facial care is skin care for the face.

Skin care is at the interface of cosmetics and dermatology. Skin care differs from dermatology by its inclusion of non-physician professionals, such as estheticians and nursing staff. Skin care includes modifications of individual behavior and of environmental and working conditions. Skin care is applied during recovery from wound healing, radiation therapy, and the management of some medications.

Skin care needs vary according to age, diseases, wounds, exposure to the sun, environmental extremes, and chemicals. Skin care products exist as regulated prescription drugs and as topical agents marketed as cosmetics but having no clinical proof of efficacy. A skin care physician is called a dermatologist.

== General care ==
The skin is the largest organ in the human body, protecting against pathogens, irritants, ultraviolet light, and mechanical injury, while also regulating temperature and water release as perspiration. Simple habits like washing and applying lotion may provide benefit, but little is known scientifically about the clinical efficacy of these practices. Skin care routines, even in hospitals and medical facilities, may be based on personal beliefs, preferences, and local circumstances rather than current evidence or best practices.

=== Lifestyle and diet ===
Drinking enough water may help to keep skin hydrated, especially in individuals who are chronically dehydrated. A poor diet lacking vitamins can lead to skin problems, such as scurvy, pellagra, and numerous subclinical skin pathologies that have not been studied in detail. Lack of sleep has been shown to make conditions like atopic dermatitis, eczema and psoriasis worse, and these conditions have in turn been shown to reduce sleep quality.

=== Products ===
There are many different forms of skin care treatments, each offering unique benefits for the skin. Some popular forms of facial care include a variety of different types of facials, facial massage, and the use of masks. These treatments can help to cleanse, hydrate, and rejuvenate the skin, leaving it looking and feeling refreshed. To achieve the best results, choose products that are suitable for your specific skin type and that address any particular skin concerns you may have. The effectiveness of skin care depends on various factors such as skin type, sensitivity, age, hyperpigmentation, and acne. The labels on cleansing and skin care products can be confusing because they use unclear words like "mild" or "gentle". This makes it hard to know how well a product works or what it actually does. Just because a product has a certain ingredient doesn't mean it is effective—how well it works depends on the whole formula and how it is used. People often mix up what a product does (like moisturizing) with what an ingredient does (like glycerin keeping moisture in or petrolatum protecting the skin).

In Europe, cosmetics are regulated under a law named Safer cosmetics for people in the EU, which enforces strict safety requirements, simplifies application and compliance procedures for companies and regulatory authorities, ensures that cosmetics products can be marketed, maintains rules governing new technical and scientific developments, and bans animal testing.

In the U.S., the Federal Food, Drug, and Cosmetic Act groups skin care products into two main categories: cosmetics and drugs. While prescription drugs must go through a strict approval process before they can be sold, cosmetics do not need FDA approval before being sold, although they are still monitored for labeling, safety, and are regulated.

Cosmeceutical and nutricosmetic are marketing terms with no scientific evidence pertaining to skin care or health, and no acceptance for validity as skin care products under US law.

=== Professional care ===
Dermatologists and estheticians offer professional skin care services. Consulting with a dermatologist is recommended for persistent or severe skin conditions. They can prescribe medications and customized skin care treatments. Some example procedures include chemical peels, laser resurfacing, photorejuvenation, photodynamic therapy, dermabrasion and microdermabrasion, collagen induction therapy, injectable fillers, botox injection, retinol therapy, ultrasonic skin treatment, and hair removal.

== Routine ==
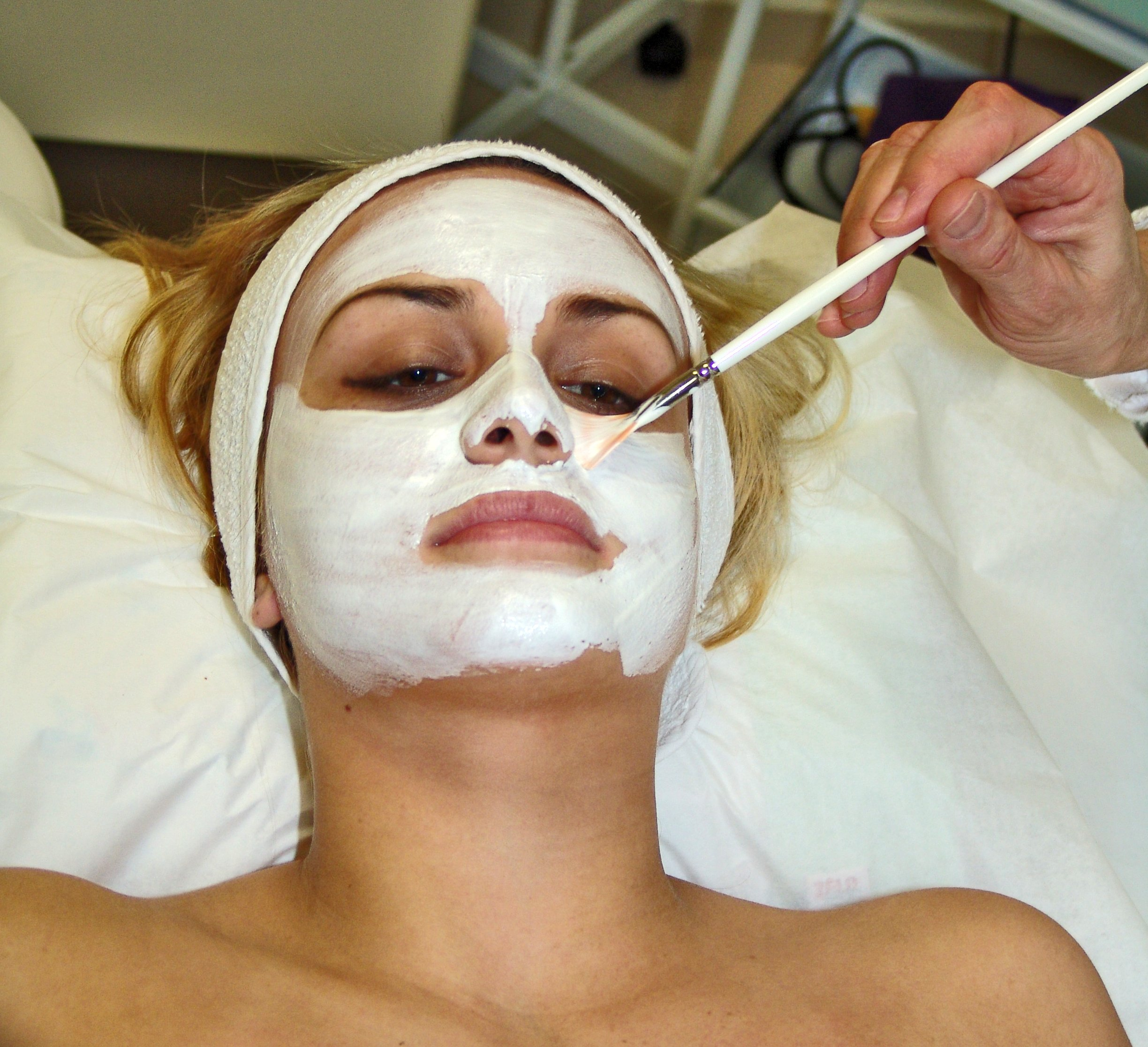
Woman getting a facial treatment

In cosmetology and esthetics education, skin care products cover a wide range of categories, includes cleansers, toners, exfoliants, masks, massage products, serums and ampoules, moisturizers, specialty products for eyes and lips, photoprotection, antiperspirants, deodorants, shaving products, and cosmetics. Instructions for how much to use, how often, and for how long are not always clear. Dermatological consensus generally prioritizes a foundational routine of gentle cleansing, moisturization, and sun protection, while reserving other products for specific clinical indications such as acne vulgaris.

=== Cleansing ===
Skin cleansers remove dirt, sebum, cosmetics, microorganisms, and dead skin from the surface of the skin. Cleansers typically rely on surfactants that lower surface tension, emulsifying impurities into a residue that is rinsed away with water. Cleansers can be divided into two basic types:

1. Traditional soaps are salts of fatty acids. They are strongly alkaline, having a pH of 8.5 to 11, which can disrupt the skin and is typically considered harsh. Nonetheless they are in widespread use.
2. Synthetic detergent cleansers (syndets) are formulated from fats, oils, and petroleum products adjusted to a mildly acidic or neutral pH (5.5-7). Syndets maintain barrier integrity and are generally mild. These are typically recommended for any patients with skin conditions.

There also exist other products such as superfatted soaps, transparent soaps, and combination bars ("combars") which are milder variations on traditional soap.

Toners are a class of facial cleansers formulated as low viscosity liquids, typically water, alcohol, and humectants. They may be applied as a spray or with cotton balls, tissues, or washcloths, typically without being washed off. Toners with less than 10% alcohol are known as fresheners or refreshers, tonic toners contain 10-20% alcohol, and astringent toners contain 20%-60% alcohol. Toners may be formulated for a variety of purposes such as cleansing, hydration, exfoliation, absorption, degreasing or unclogging pores, tightening skin, and restoring skin pH balance.

=== Exfoliating ===
Exfoliation is the removal of skin cells from the skin's surface. Exfoliation is typically done primarily for cosmetic reasons such as skin roughness and appearance. Available evidence is insufficient to develop recommendations for using chemical peels with acne or photodamage, but they are often used as an adjunct to medical therapy.

There are two main ways to exfoliate:

- Mechanical exfoliation uses physical friction such as a brush or scrub.
- Chemical exfoliation uses chemicals to dissolve dead skin cells. Light chemical peels can be done at home, while a dermatologist does medium or deep peels.

Excessive exfoliation can cause irritation and barrier damage such as irritant contact dermatitis. This can be avoided by exfoliating less frequently or using milder products. Chemical exfoliants are typically less harsh than mechanical exfoliation.

=== Moisturizing ===
Moisturizers increase the water content of the skin and ameliorate dry skin. The classification is more of a marketing term than a medical or scientific one. Different formulations exist for different skin types. The mechanisms of action of moisturizers can be categorized as humectants, occlusives, emollients, and protein rejuvenators, although in practice a product is often combination of multiple ingredients and mechanisms. Moisturizers may take a variety of states, textures, and application methods such as ointment, cream, gel, lotion, solution, foam, or spray. Applying moisturizers liberally can be time-intensive but helps with atopic dermatitis. More generally, moisturizers are often used as delivery vehicles for drug products for skin diseases and disorders. A drug is often available in multiple formats which have equivalent effects, allowing the patient to choose one for tolerability and ease of use.

=== Targeted treatment ===
Besides the basic formulations for cleansing, moisturizing, and exfoliation, a variety of specialized products and delivery formats exist. For example facial masks can help ingredients absorb into the skin better than other forms of product. Many different types of cremes, lotions, gels, and oils are used to lubricate and moisturize the skin and reduce the friction between skin (hands of technician and client) during massage. Serums, ampoules, boosters, and essences are leave-on formulations similar to toner, often with fragrances and preservatives that may cause allergies. The difference is essentially the packaging, such as a dropper bottle for serum or small vials for a product distributed as ampoules. Eye creams are associated with anti-aging products; although the research for these products is flimsy, common ingredients in creams specialized for the under-eye region do have a scientific basis. Lip products such as lipstick, lip gloss and lip balm are used to prevent drying and chapping as well as to brighten and beautify the lips.

== Skin care by age ==
=== Neonate ===
Guidelines for neonatal skin care have been developed. Nevertheless, the pediatric and dermatological communities have not reached a consensus on best cleansing practices, as good quality scientific evidence is scarce. Immersion in water seems superior to washing alone, and use of synthetic detergents or mild liquid baby cleansers seems comparable or superior to water alone.

=== Children and adolescents ===
Dermatologists normally recommend that children wash their skin with a mild cleanser, use moisturizing lotion as needed, and wear sunscreen every day. Elaborate skin care routines are promoted on social media platforms such as TikTok. This has led to children and teens using harsh and inappropriate products, such as anti-aging products, which provide no benefit to young skin and may be harmful. It has also encouraged children and teens to wear sunscreen every day.

=== Elderly ===
Skin ageing is associated with increased skin vulnerability, and the texture and colour of the skin can change over time. Although wrinkles occur naturally due to ageing, smoking can intensify the appearance of wrinkles. Sunspots, dryness, wrinkles, and melanomas can occur from UV exposure over time, whether it be through the sun or through tanning beds. Exposure to UV can make skin less elastic. Skin problems including pruritus are common in the elderly but are often inadequately addressed. A literature review of studies assessing the maintenance of skin integrity in the elderly found most studies to have low levels of evidence, but the review concluded that skin-cleansing with synthetic detergents or amphoteric surfactants induced less skin dryness than using soap and water. Moisturizers with humectants helped with skin dryness and skin barrier occlusive reduced skin injuries. When taking baths or showers, using warm water rather than hot water can aid with dryness.

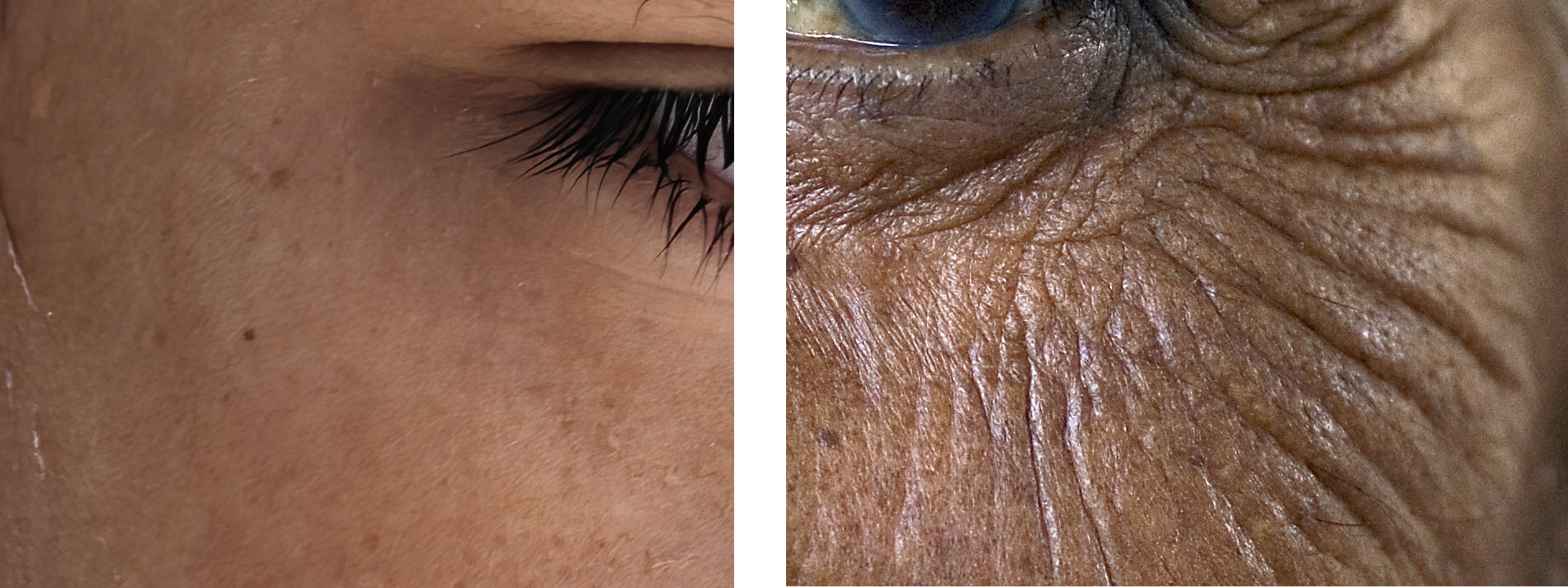
Young vs old skin

There is limited evidence that moisturizing soap bar; combinations of water soak, oil soak, and lotion are effective in maintaining the skin integrity of elderly people when compared to standard care.

== Specific skin concerns ==
=== Sun protection ===
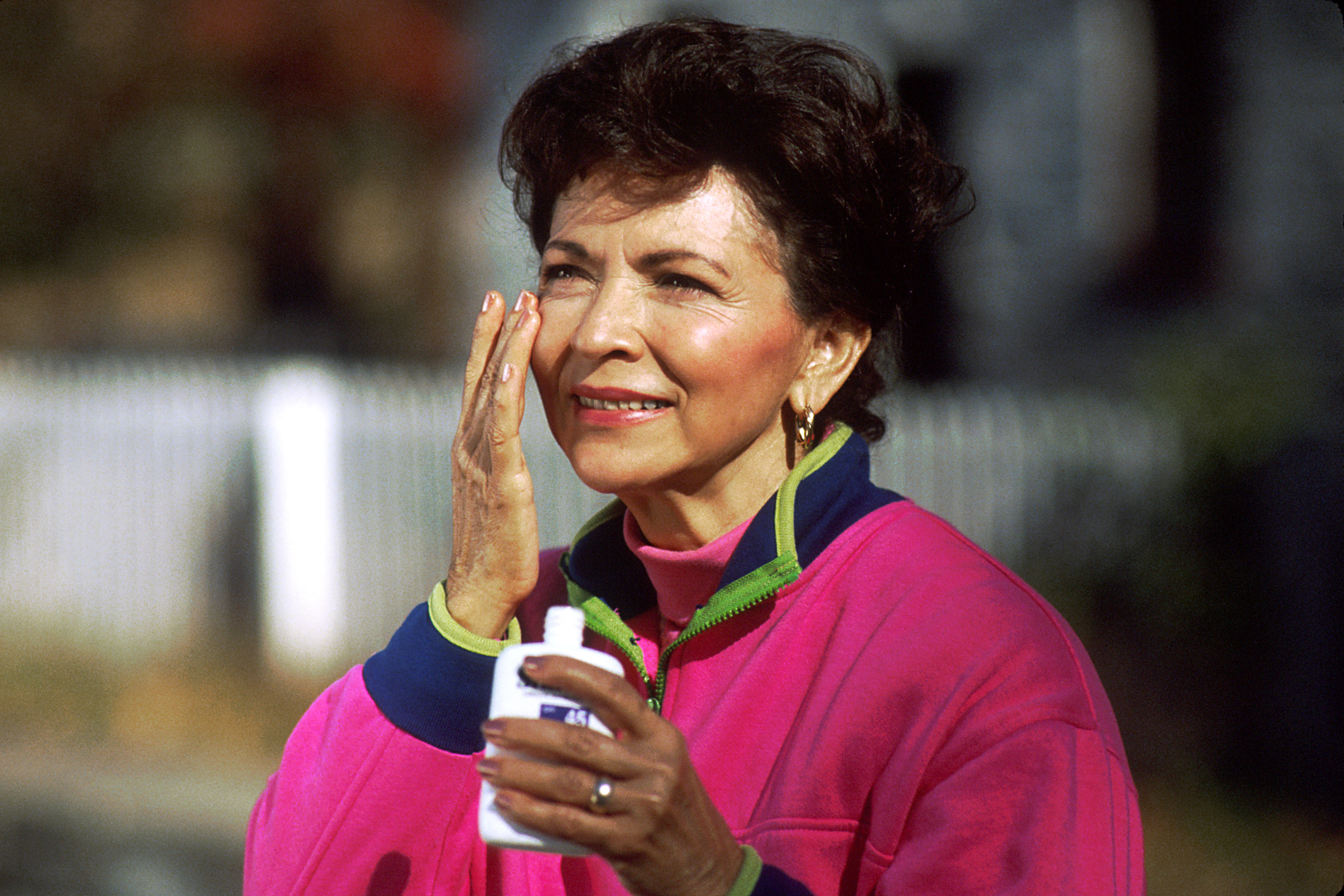
A woman applying sunscreen

Sunscreen is a skincare product designed to protect the skin from the harmful effects of chronic exposure to UV radiation. Though the sun is beneficial in order for the human body to get its daily dose of vitamin D, unprotected excessive sunlight can cause extreme damage to the skin. Ultraviolet (UVA and UVB) radiation in the sun's rays can cause sunburn in varying degrees, early ageing and an increased risk of skin cancer. UV exposure can cause patches of uneven skin tone and dry out the skin. It can reduce skin's elasticity and encourage sagging and wrinkle formation. UV radiation can lead to skin thickening, wrinkle formation, inflammation, and even carcinogenesis. These effects occur due to the continuous oxidative stress state induced by an excessive generation of reactive oxygen species (ROS) from UV irradiation. This oxidative stress ultimately leads to cell apoptosis events and degradation of collagen, resulting in the undesired morphologic changes in the skin.

Sunscreen helps prevent these harmful effects by providing a protective barrier against UV radiation, reducing the risk of skin damage and associated skin conditions. Sunscreen is generally recommended to be applied before sun exposure and reapplied regularly, especially after sweating or swimming. Sunscreen should be applied to all areas of the skin that will be exposed to sunlight, and at least a tablespoon (25 ml) should be applied to each limb, the face, chest, and back, to ensure thorough coverage. Many tinted moisturizers, foundations and primers now contain some form of SPF.

Sunscreens may come in the form of creams, gels or lotions; their SPF number indicates their effectiveness in protecting the skin from the sun's radiation. There are sunscreens available to suit every skin type; in particular, those with oily skin should choose non-comedogenic sunscreens; those with dry skins should choose sunscreens with moisturizers to help keep skin hydrated, and those with sensitive skin should choose unscented, hypoallergenic sunscreen and spot-test in an inconspicuous place (such as the inside of the elbow or behind the ear) to ensure that it does not irritate the skin.

=== Skin sensitivity and irritation ===
Applying moisturizer twice a day may strengthen the skin's natural barrier, but how well it works depends on the formulation of the moisturizer. Even on healthy skin, moisturizers can help protect against things that might cause irritation. 2.5% or 5% dexpanthenol is known to reduce irritation. Products made for sensitive skin are usually labeled as gentle, fragrance-free, and hypoallergenic.

=== Oily skin ===
Healthy sebaceous glands produce a substance called sebum, a naturally healthy skin lubricant. When the skin produces excessive sebum, it becomes heavy and thick in texture, known as oily skin. Oily skin is typified by shininess, blemishes and pimples. The oily-skin type is not necessarily bad, since such skin is less prone to wrinkling, or other signs of ageing, because the oil helps to keep needed moisture locked into the epidermis (outermost layer of skin). The negative aspect of the oily-skin type is that oily complexions are especially susceptible to clogged pores, blackheads, and buildup of dead skin cells on the surface of the skin. Oily skin can be sallow and rough in texture and tends to have large, clearly visible pores everywhere, except around the eyes and neck. A high glycemic-index diet and dairy products (except for cheese) consumption increase IGF-1 generation, which in turn increases sebum production. Overwashing the skin does not cause sebum overproduction but may cause dryness; it is possible to have skin that is both dry and oily.

=== Dry skin ===
Dry skin does not have enough moisture. It will show signs like flaking, tightness, roughness, redness, or cracks. If the skin is very dry, it might also look swollen or extra soft. Common areas that get dry include the face, scalp, and back—especially when exposed to air or clothing. However, places where the skin folds, like under the arms, between the toes, and around the groin, usually do not get as dry.

Washing dry skin should be done daily using lukewarm water (less than 37 °C (99 °F)). Avoid long or frequent baths and showers. Try to keep bath time under five minutes per day. If the skin is extremely dry, avoid using regular soap and water, as they can make dryness worse. Instead, use gentle, alkali-free cleansers with a pH of 4 to 5, especially ones with ingredients like urea, lactic acid, or glycerin, which help keep moisture in.

Moisturizing dry skin at least twice a day is important. If the skin is very dry, moisturizing more often may help. Thicker, oil-based creams work best for very dry skin. Aqueous cream should be avoided. It also helps to apply a skin protectant. Using a moisturizer with niacinamide and glycerin twice a day has been shown to strengthen the skin and reduce dryness, versus moisturizers without niacinamide.

=== Diaper rash ===
To keep the skin healthy, it's best to clean it gently every day with a no-rinse cleanser (pH 5.5). Using soap and water takes more time and does not work as well. After cleaning, the skin should be dried gently—don't scrub, as this can damage the skin's natural barrier. A protective cream or ointment, such as zinc oxide, petroleum jelly, or dimethicone, should be applied to shield the skin. Cleaning should be done after every accident to limit contact with urine or stool.

=== Acne ===
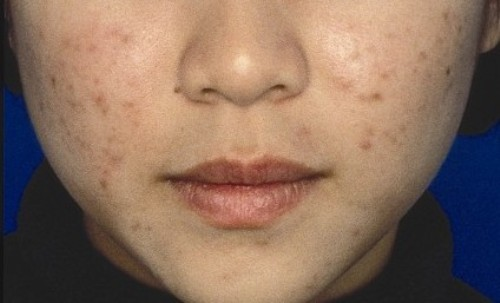
Representation of acne

Acne is defined by clogged pores and bacteria. According to the American Academy of Dermatology, between 40 and 50 million Americans develop acne each year. Although many associate acne with adolescence, acne can occur at any age, with its causes including heredity, hormones, menstruation, food, and emotional stress.

Acne is treated with ingredients like salicylic acid, benzoyl peroxide, and retinoids. Those with inflammatory acne should exfoliate with caution as the procedure may make conditions worse and consult a dermatologist before treatment. Benzoyl peroxide is a drying agent and is typically found in concentrations of 2.5 - 10%.

=== Eczema and dermatitis ===
Dermatitis is a term used for different types of skin inflammation, typically characterized by itchiness, redness and a rash. Dermatitis may also be called eczema, but the same term is often used for the most common type of skin inflammation, atopic dermatitis. Dermatitis can be managed with moisturizers and prescription anti-inflammatory treatments, whereas topical antimicrobials, antiseptics, and antihistamines are not recommended by dermatologists.

=== Psoriasis ===
Psoriasis is a long-lasting, noncontagious autoimmune disease characterized by patches of abnormal skin. Topical skin care agents are typically used for mild disease.

=== Rosacea ===
Rosacea is a long-term skin condition that typically causes redness, visible blood vessels, and small bumps on the face. Medications with good evidence include topical metronidazole, ivermectin and azelaic acid.

=== Hyperpigmentation ===
Hyperpigmentation, also known as dark spots, is the darkening of an area of skin or nails caused by increased melanin. Many topical treatments disrupt the synthesis of melanin by inhibiting the enzyme tyrosine hydroxylase.

=== Aging and wrinkles ===
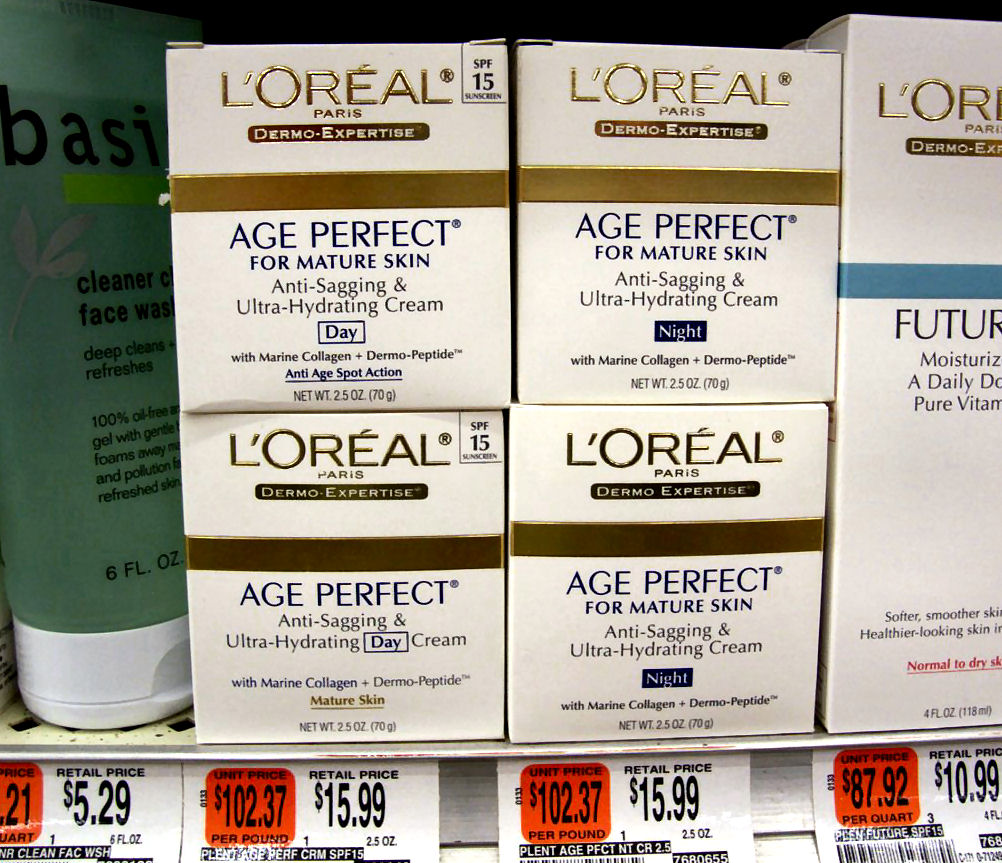
Anti-aging cream. The manufacturer of these products received an FDA warning letter in February 2015 for falsely advertising its cosmetics products as drugs.

Anti-aging creams are predominantly moisturizer-based skin care products marketed with unproven claims of making the consumer look younger by reducing, masking or preventing signs of skin aging such as wrinkles. In the United States, anti-aging products are commonly marketed with false health claims, and are deemed to be among various scams on consumers.

=== Pressure ulcer ===
Pressure sores, also called bedsores or pressure ulcers, are injuries to the skin and tissue caused by staying in one position for too long. To treat them, the skin should be washed with lukewarm water and dried completely, especially in areas where skin touches skin, like between the toes, under the breasts, in the groin, and under the arms. Harsh soaps should be avoided—it is better to use gentle, pH-balanced cleansers. Moisturizers can help protect the skin, but they shouldn't be used between the toes. It is best to apply a hypoallergenic moisturizer twice a day, especially on the arms and legs, and avoid rubbing the skin too hard.

=== Wound healing ===
Wound healing is a complex and fragile process in which the skin repairs itself after injury. It is susceptible to interruption or failure that creates non-healing chronic wounds.

=== Radiation ===
Radiation induces skin reactions in the treated area, particularly in the axilla, head and neck, perineum and skin fold regions. Formulations with moisturising, anti-inflammatory, anti-microbial and wound healing properties are often used, but no preferred approach or individual product has been identified as best practice. Soft silicone dressings that act as barriers to friction may be helpful. In breast cancer, calendula cream may reduce the severity of radiation effects on the dark spot corrector. Deodorant use after completing radiation treatment has been controversial but is now recommended for practice.

=== EGFR side effects ===
Epidermal growth factor receptor (EGFR) inhibitors are medications used in cancer treatment. These medications commonly cause skin and nail problems, including rashes, dry skin and paronychia. Preventive intensive moisturizing with emollient ointments several times, avoidance of water-based creams and water soaks (although in certain circumstances white vinegar or potassium permanganate soaks may help), protection the skin from excessive exposure to sunshine, and soap substitutes which are less dehydrating for the skin than normal soaps, as well as shampoos that reduce the risk of scalp folliculitis, are recommended. Treatment measures with topical antibiotic medication can be helpful.
