= Anti-aging product =

Supplement and cosmetics products

Anti-aging supplements are ingestible products—such as vitamin capsules, powders, or teas—marketed with the message of slowing or reversing the aging process. However, there is no clinical evidence that such products provide any effect on health or the process of aging. Anti-aging creams (or anti-wrinkle creams) are cosmetics products, typically moisturizer-based, that are promoted for reducing, masking, or preventing visible signs of skin aging, such as wrinkles, discoloration, or loss of elasticity. These claims are not supported by conclusive scientific evidence.

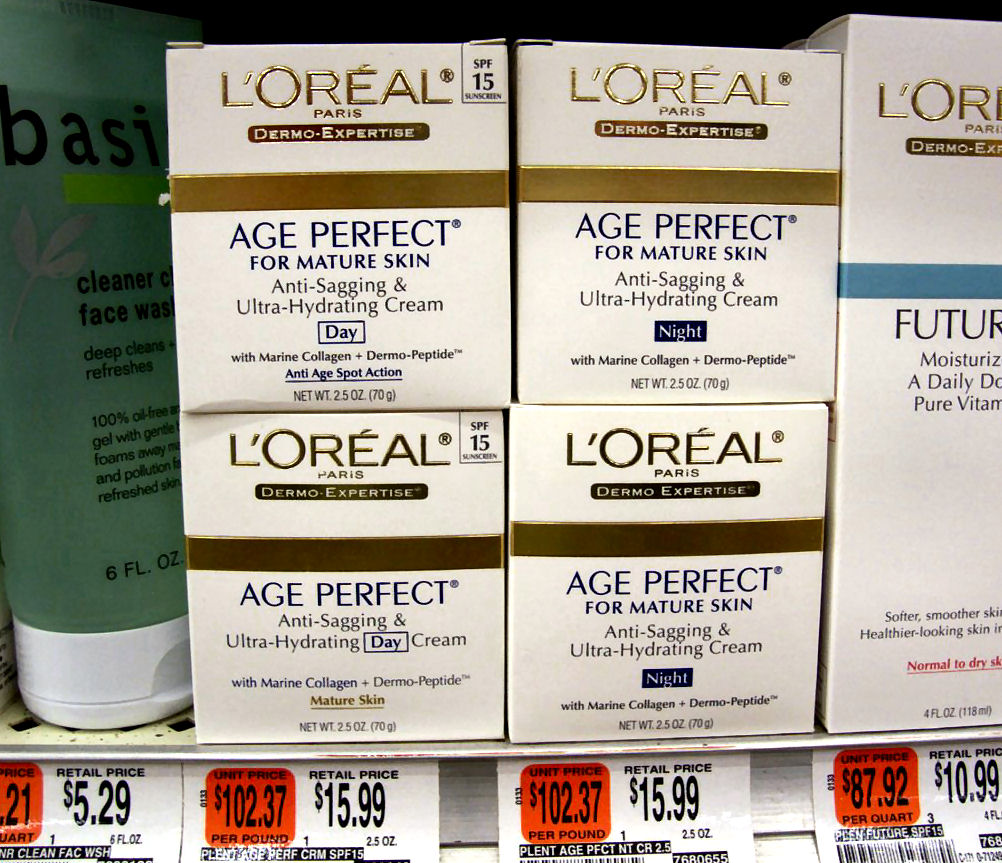
Skin cosmetics marketed as anti-aging creams. The manufacturer of these products received a warning letter from the US Food and Drug Administration in February 2015 for falsely marketing its products as if they were approved drugs.

== False health claims ==
In the United States, anti-aging products are commonly marketed with false health claims, and are deemed to be scams on consumers. Since 2007, the US Food and Drug Administration (FDA) has issued dozens of warning letters to manufacturers of skin care products with false marketing – including supposed anti-aging effects – about the benefits of such products, which are not authorized to be marketed as drugs that would require FDA approval as safe and effective for treating the aging process.

== Audience marketing ==
Social media marketing has been effective at getting children and teenagers to buy anti-aging skin care products.

Traditionally, anti-aging creams have been marketed towards women, but products specifically targeting men are common in the 21st century. Marketing of anti-aging products has been criticized as reinforcing ageism, particularly against women. Anti-aging promotions specifically reinforce the belief that older people should look like middle-aged people, and that old age comes with a loss of gender identity.
