= Universal flu vaccine =

Vaccine that prevents infection from all strains of the flu

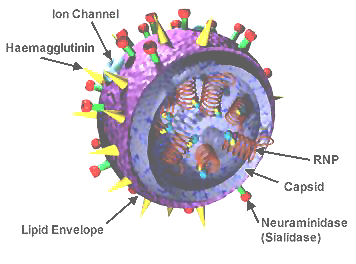
The Influenza virus has both hemagglutinin and neuraminidase spikes that are being used as antigen binding sites in the search for a universal vaccine.

A universal flu vaccine would be a flu vaccine effective against all human-adapted strains of influenza A and influenza B regardless of the virus sub type, or any antigenic drift or antigenic shift. Hence it should not require modification from year to year in order to keep up with changes in the influenza virus. As of 2024 no universal flu vaccine had been successfully developed, however several candidate vaccines were in development, with some undergoing early stage clinical trial.

== Medical uses ==
New vaccines against currently circulating influenza variants are required every year due to the diversity of flu viruses and variable efficacy of vaccines to prevent them. A universal vaccine would eliminate the need to create a vaccine for each year's variants. The efficacy of a vaccine refers to the protection against a broad variety of influenza strains. Events such as antigenic shift have created pandemic strains such as the H1N1 outbreak in 2009. The research required every year to isolate a potential popular viral strain and create a vaccine to defend against it is a six-month-long process; during that time the virus can mutate, making the vaccines less effective.

If a universal vaccine can be developed which is both effective and safe, it could be manufactured in quantity and eliminate availability and supply issues of current vaccines.

Centivax, a biotech company, has developed a universal flu vaccine candidate that has shown promise in preclinical studies. The vaccine aims to provide broad protection against various influenza strains by targeting conserved regions of the virus. The company has raised $45 million to advance the vaccine through clinical trials.

== Influenza virus ==
Human influenza is principally caused by the Influenza A and Influenza B viruses. Both have similar structure, being enveloped RNA virus. Their protein membrane contains the glycoproteins hemagglutinin (HA) and neuraminidase (NA) which are used by the virus to enter a host cell, and subsequently to release newly manufactured virions from the host cell. Each strain of the influenza virus has a different pattern of glycoproteins; the glycoproteins themselves have variability as well.

== History ==
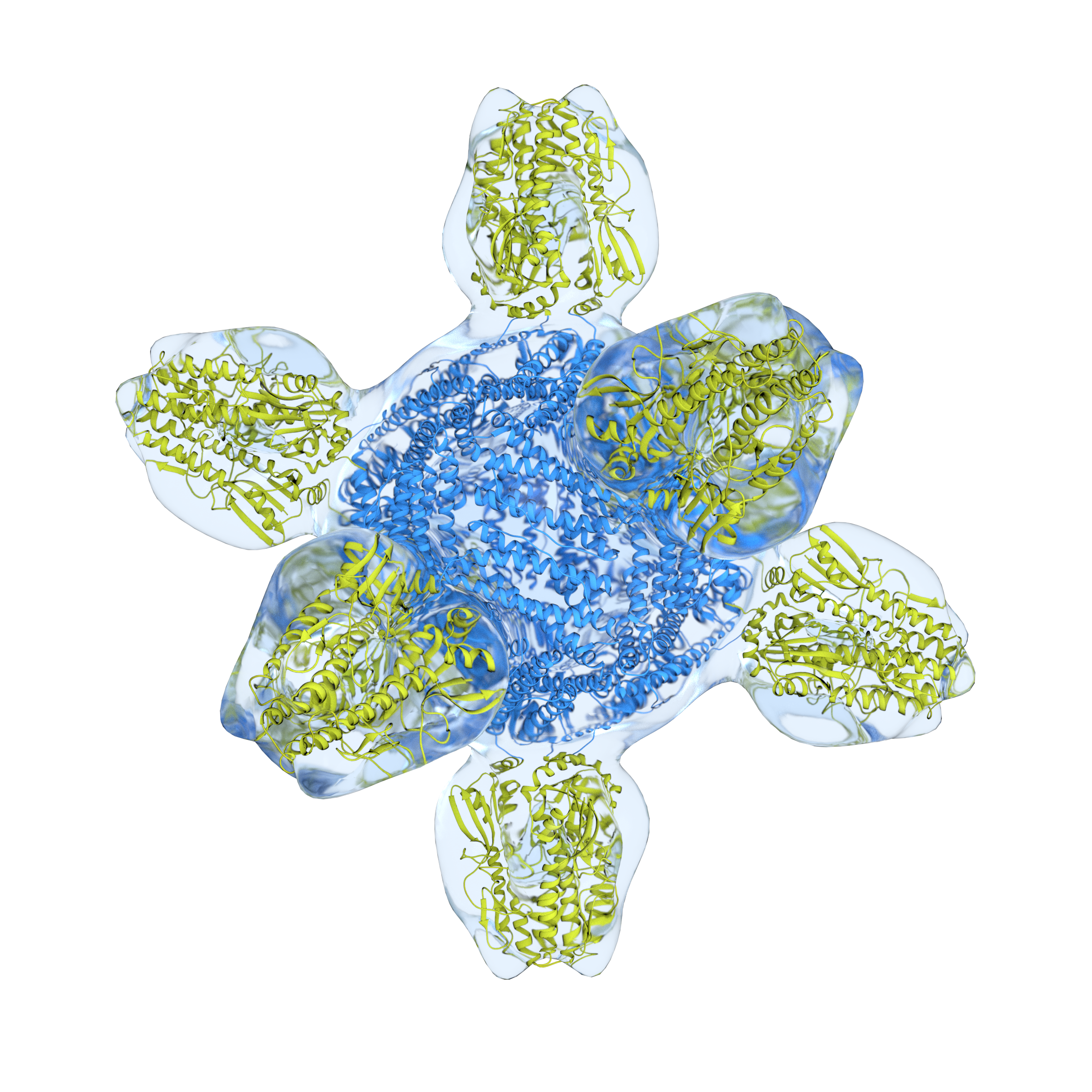
A prototype for a universal flu vaccine. The blue protein scaffold supports eight green influenza hemagglutinin proteins arrayed to present antibody binding sites

In 2008, Acambis announced work on a universal flu vaccine (ACAM-FLU-ATM) based on the less variable M2 protein component of the flu virus shell. See also H5N1 vaccines.

In 2009, the Wistar Institute in Pennsylvania received a patent for using "a variety of peptides" in a flu vaccine, and announced it was seeking a corporate partner.

In 2010, the National Institute of Allergy and Infectious Diseases (NIAID) of the U.S. NIH announced a breakthrough; the effort targets the stem, which mutates less often than the head of the viral HA.

By 2010 some universal flu vaccines had started clinical trials.

- BiondVax identified 9 conserved epitopes of the influenza virus and combined them into a recombinant protein called Multimeric-001. All seven of Biondvax's completed phase 2 human trials demonstrated safety and significant levels of immunogenicity; however in October 2020, results of the phase 3 study were published, indicating no apparent efficacy.
- ITS's fp01 includes 6 peptide antigens to highly conserved segments of the PA, PB1, PB2, NP & M1 proteins, and has started phase I trials.

DNA vaccines, such as VGX-3400X (aimed at multiple H5N1 strains), contain DNA fragments (plasmids). Inovio's SynCon DNA vaccines include H5N1 and H1N1 subtypes.

Other companies pursuing the vaccine as of 2009 and 2010 include Theraclone, VaxInnate, Crucell NV, Inovio Pharmaceuticals, Immune Targeting Systems (ITS) and iQur.

In 2019, Distributed Bio completed pre-clinical trials of a vaccine that consists of computationally selected distant evolutionary variants of hemagglutinin epitopes and is expected to begin human trials in 2021.

In recent years, research has concerned use of an antigen for the flu hemagglutinin (HA) stem. Based on the results of animal studies, a universal flu vaccine may use a two-step vaccination strategy: priming with a DNA-based HA vaccine, followed by a second dose with an inactivated, attenuated, or adenovirus-vector-based vaccine.

Some people given a 2009 H1N1 flu vaccine have developed broadly protective antibodies, raising hopes for a universal flu vaccine.

A vaccine based on the hemagglutinin (HA) stem was the first to induce "broadly neutralizing" antibodies to both HA-group 1 and HA-group 2 influenza in mice.

In July 2011, researchers created an antibody, which targets a protein found on the surface of all influenza A viruses called haemagglutinin. FI6 is the only known antibody that binds (its neutralizing activity is controversial) to all 16 subtypes of the influenza A virus hemagglutinin and might be the lynchpin for a universal influenza vaccine. The subdomain of the hemagglutinin that is targeted by FI6, namely the stalk domain, was actually successfully used earlier as universal influenza virus vaccine by Peter Palese's research group at Mount Sinai School of Medicine.

Other vaccines are polypeptide based.

== Research ==
A study from the Albert Einstein College of Medicine, where researchers deleted gD-2 from the herpes virus, which is responsible for HSV microbes entering in and out of cells showed as of May 1, 2018 the same vaccine can be used in a modified way to contain hemagglutinin and invoke a special ADCC immune response.

The Washington University School of Medicine in St. Louis and the Icahn School of Medicine in Mount Sinai in New York are using the glycoprotein neuraminidase as a targeted antigen in their research. Three monoclonal antibodies (mAB) were sampled from a patient infected with influenza A H3N2 virus. The antibodies were able to bind to the neuraminidase active site neutralizing the virus across multiple strains. The site remains the same with minimal variability across most of the flu strains. In trials using mice all three antibodies were effective across multiple strains, one antibody was able to protect the mice from all 12 strains tested including human and non-human flu viruses. All mice used in the experiments survived even if the antibody was not administered until 72 hours after the time of infection.

Simultaneously the NIAID is working on a peptide vaccine that is starting human clinical trials in the 2019 flu season. The study will include 10,000 participants who will be monitored for two flu seasons. The vaccine will show efficacy if it is able to reduce the number of influenza cases in all strains.

There have been some clinical trials of the M-001 and H1ssF_3928 universal influenza vaccine candidates. As of August 2020, all seven M-001 trials are completed. Each one of these studies resulted in the conclusion that M-001 is safe, tolerable, and immunogenic. Their pivotal Phase III study with 12,400 participants was completed and results of the data analysis were published in October 2020, indicating that the vaccine did not show any statistical difference from the placebo group in reduction of flu illness and severity.

In 2019–2020, a vaccine candidate from Peter Palese's group at Mount Sinai Hospital emerged from a phase 1 clinical trial with positive results. By vaccinating twice with hemagglutinins that have different "heads" but the same membrane-proximal "stalk", the immune system is directed to focus its attention on the conserved stalk.

In September 2023, the National Institutes of Health (NIH) initiated a Phase 1 clinical trial to evaluate a new universal influenza vaccine candidate. The trial enrolled 24 healthy volunteers aged 18–50 years to assess the vaccine's safety and its ability to generate an immune response. Participants received two intramuscular injections of the investigational vaccine over a period of 40 weeks.

The FLUniversal consortium, funded by the European Union, is working towards developing a universal influenza vaccine. The consortium brings together partners with expertise in different areas of vaccine development to create a vaccine that provides broader and more durable protection against seasonal and pandemic influenza.

Osivax, a biotechnology company, is developing a universal influenza vaccine using its proprietary ORF virus-like particle (VLP) platform. The company has received a $19.5 million contract from the Biomedical Advanced Research and Development Authority (BARDA) to support the development of its vaccine candidate.

Researchers at Oregon Health & Science University (OHSU) have conducted a study that shows promise for a universal flu vaccine. The study, published in Nature Communications, demonstrated that a vaccine candidate could protect non-human primates from lethal influenza challenges.

== See also ==
- Universal coronavirus vaccine
