= F16 (disambiguation) =

F16, F 16, F-16 or FI6 may refer to:

- General Dynamics F-16 Fighting Falcon, a 1974 American multirole fighter jet aircraft
- FI6 (antibody), an antibody that targets influenza A viruses
- F 16 Uppsala, a Swedish air force base
- Formula 16, a 5-metre catamaran
  - Nacra F16 a Formula 16 catamaran design
- Italian submarine F16, an Italian Regia Marina (Royal Navy) submarine in commission from 1917 to 1928
- Volvo F16, a truck
- Half-precision floating-point format, a 16-bit computer number format
- Shibuya Station, a railway station in Tokyo, coded as F16 on the Fukutoshin Line
- Fluorine-16 (F-16 or ^{16}F), an isotope of fluorine

== See also ==
- F-16 Rachanon (born 1991), Thai kickboxer
