= List of mammals that can get H5N1 =

Mammal species that have been infected with H5N1

Although a wide variety of bird species have been shown to contract and spread Influenza A virus subtype H5N1, from waterfowl to poultry and birds of prey, mammalian infections have been of particular interest to researchers due to their potential to develop mutations that increase the risk of mammal-to-mammal spread and transmission to and among humans.

== Mammals known to have been infected ==
Other influenza strains are common among mammals, including humans, but this list only shows those who have been proven to carry H5N1. In October 2022, farmed mink became the first detected mammal able to engage in mammal-to-mammal spread of H5N1.

Animal	Date first detected (or publicized)	Spread amongst themselves?	Spreads to humans?	Captive or wild infection?	References
Alpaca	May 2024			Captive	
American black bear	November 2022				
Amur leopard	September 2022				
Arctic fox	2023			Captive	
Asian golden cat	2009			Captive	
Beech marten	2007			Wild	
Bobcat	May 2022				
Bottlenose dolphin	August 2022				
Caspian seal	December 2022	Under Investigation		Wild	
Cat	2004			Both	
Cattle	March 2024	Yes	Yes	Captive	
Clouded leopard	2009			Captive	
Coyote	June 2022				
Dog	2004			Captive	
Dolphin	August 2026			Wild	
Donkey	2009				
Elephant seal	November 2023			Wild	
Eurasian otter	2021			Wild	
Fisher	June 2022				
Fur seal	November 2023			Wild	
Goat	March 2024			Captive	
Grey seal	July 2022			Wild	
Grizzly bear	December 2022				
Harbor seal	July 2022			Wild	
Human	May 1997				
Kodiak bear	December 2022				
Leopard	2003			Captive	
Lion	2009			Captive	
Mink	October 2022	Yes		Captive	
Mountain lion	March 2023				
Mouse	June 2024			Wild	
Owston's palm civet	2006				
Pig	2004			Captive	
Polar bear	December 2023			Wild	
Raccoon	June 2022				
Rat	Feb 2025				
Red fox	May 2021			Wild	
Sea lion	November 2022			Wild	
Sheep	March 2025				
Skunk	August 2022				
Striped skunk	June 2022				
Tiger	2003			Captive	
Vampire bat	2026			Wild	
Virginia opossum	May 2022				

== See also ==
- 2020–2026 H5N1 outbreak
- Avian influenza
- Influenza A virus
- Swine influenza
- COVID-19 pandemic and animals
- Cross-species transmission
