= Jędrzejczyk =

Jędrzejczyk is a Polish surname. Notable people with the surname include:

- Artur Jędrzejczyk (born 1987), Polish footballer
- Joanna Jędrzejczyk (born 1987), Polish martial arts performer
- Paweł Jędrzejczyk (born 1980), Polish martial arts performer
