= OIE/FAO Network of Expertise on Animal Influenza =

OFFLU is the joint OIE-FAO global network of expertise on animal influenzas. OFFLU aims to reduce the negative impacts of animal influenza viruses by promoting effective collaboration between animal health experts and the human health sector. OFFLU analyzes and shares information and biological material to identify and reduce health threats early, and shares information about animal influenza viruses with the World Health Organization (WHO) to assist with the early preparation of human vaccines. It was established in 2005, initially to support the global effort to control H5N1 highly pathogenic avian influenza.

The technical contribution to OFFLU is provided by an open network of experts in animal influenza from the OIE and FAO Reference Laboratories and Collaborating Centres, and from other institutes with leading expertise in diagnostics, epidemiology, bioinformatics, vaccinology, and animal production. Under the coordination and management of OFFLU, experts work together in discussion groups called OFFLU Technical Activities on pertinent topics and on technical projects to provide concrete outputs on relevant influenza-related issues. To date, these Technical Activities have delivered guidance on diagnostic protocols, antigenic matching of vaccine strains with circulating field viruses, minimum biosafety guidelines for laboratory workers, and strategic guidance on animal influenza surveillance.

The effectiveness and degree of collaboration between OFFLU and the human health sector (WHO) has improved significantly. This was highlighted following the emergence of pandemic H1N1 in April 2009 when OFFLU rapidly mobilised its experts to address the human-animal interface aspects of pandemic H1N1 jointly with colleagues from the public health sector.

OFFLU continues to develop in terms of scope and geographical representation and is looking ahead to developing a sustainable and effective mechanism for monitoring influenza viruses in animals and for communicating significant findings to all partners quickly.

== OFFLU's Objectives ==
- To share and offer technical advice, training, and veterinary expertise to international organisations and Member Countries to assist in the prevention, diagnosis, surveillance and control of animal influenza.
- To exchange scientific data and biological materials (including virus strains) within the network, to analyse such data, and to share such information with the wider scientific community.
- To collaborate with the WHO on issues relating to the animal-human interface, including pandemic preparedness for early preparation of the human vaccine.
- To highlight influenza surveillance and research needs, promote their development, and ensure co-ordination.

== Structure ==
The OFFLU network is managed by a steering committee who provide strategic direction, an Executive Committee who implement the decisions of the steering committee, a secretariat, and a dedicated OFFLU scientist. The network itself is made up of world leading scientists from a range of fields including virology, epidemiology, bioinformatics, vaccinology, and animal production.

== Origins ==
In February 2006, OFFLU launched a campaign for openness when Dr. Ilaria Capua of Italy, chair of the network's Scientific Committee, published sequence data on H5N1 strains from Nigeria and Italy and urged 50 colleagues around the world to share their data. In March, the OFFLU Scientific Committee decided "to put new emphasis on the need for further collection, characterisation, and exchange" of avian flu viruses and for expansion of sequence data, the FAO reported. At about the same time, Capua and four OFFLU colleagues wrote a letter to the journal Science promising to make H5N1 samples available for sequencing."
