= Avian influenza =

Influenza caused by viruses adapted to birds

Avian influenza, also known as avian flu or bird flu, is a disease caused by the influenza A virus, which primarily affects birds but can sometimes affect mammals including humans. Wild aquatic birds are the primary host of the influenza A virus, which is enzootic (continually present) in many bird populations.

Symptoms of avian influenza vary according to both the strain of virus underlying the infection, and on the species of bird or mammal affected. Classification of a virus strain as either low pathogenic avian influenza (LPAI) or high pathogenic avian influenza (HPAI) is based on the severity of symptoms in domestic chickens and does not predict severity of symptoms in other species. Chickens infected with LPAI display mild symptoms or are asymptomatic, whereas HPAI causes serious breathing difficulties, significant drop in egg production, and sudden death. Domestic poultry may potentially be protected from specific strains of the virus by vaccination.

Humans typically become infected with avian influenza after prolonged close contact with infected birds or non-human mammals. However, cases have also been linked to consumption of improperly prepared animal byproducts, contact with contaminated surfaces, and, in rare cases, limited human-to-human spread. Symptoms of infection vary from mild to severe, including fever, diarrhea, and cough.

The influenza A virus is shed in the saliva, mucus, and feces of infected birds; other infected animals may shed bird flu viruses in respiratory secretions and other body fluids (e.g., cow milk). The virus can spread rapidly through poultry flocks and among wild birds. A particularly virulent strain, influenza A virus subtype H5N1 (A/H5N1) has the potential to devastate domesticated poultry stocks and an estimated half a billion farmed birds have been slaughtered in efforts to contain the virus.

== Highly pathogenic avian influenza ==
Because of the impact of avian influenza on economically important chicken farms, a classification system was devised in 1981 which divided avian virus strains as either highly pathogenic (and therefore potentially requiring vigorous control measures) or low pathogenic. The test for this is based solely on the effect on chickens – a virus strain is highly pathogenic avian influenza (HPAI) if 75% or more of chickens die after being deliberately infected with it. The alternative classification is low pathogenic avian influenza (LPAI). This classification system has since been modified to take into account the structure of the virus' haemagglutinin protein. Other species of birds, especially water birds, can become infected with HPAI virus without experiencing severe symptoms and can spread the infection over large distances; the exact symptoms depend on the species of bird and the strain of virus. Classification of an avian virus strain as HPAI or LPAI does not predict how serious the disease might be if it infects humans or other mammals.

Since 2006, the World Organization for Animal Health requires all LPAI H5 and H7 detections to be reported because of their potential to mutate into highly pathogenic strains.

== Virology ==
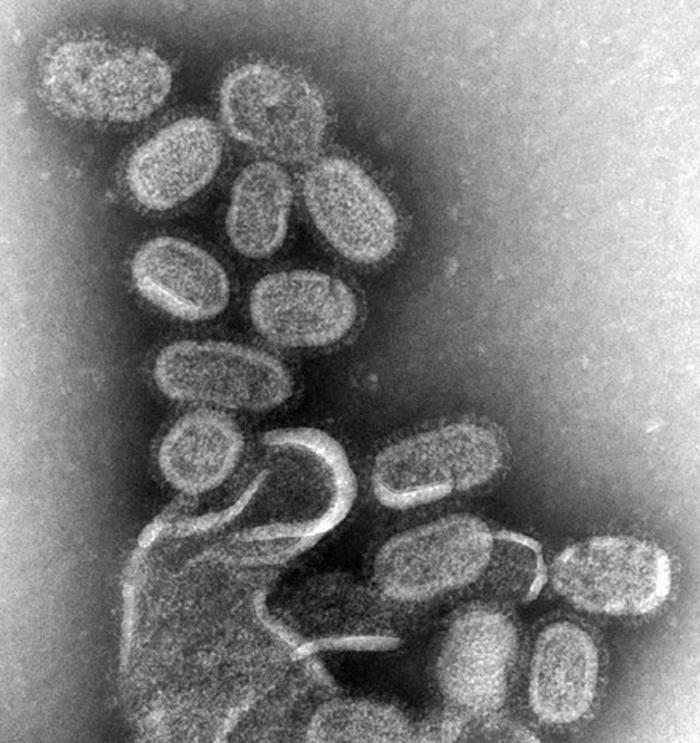
A transmission electron micrograph (TEM) of the reconstructed 1918 pandemic influenza virus. The bottom structure represents membrane debris from the cells used to amplify the virus.

Avian influenza is caused by the influenza A virus which principally affects birds but can also infect humans and other mammals. Influenza A is an RNA virus with a genome comprising a negative-sense, RNA segmented genome that encodes 11 viral genes. The virus particle (also called the virion) is 80–120 nanometers in diameter and elliptical or filamentous in shape. There is evidence that the virus can survive for long periods in freshwater after being excreted in feces by its avian host, and can withstand prolonged freezing.

There are two proteins on the surface of the viral envelope; hemagglutinin and neuraminidase. These are the major antigens of the virus against which neutralizing antibodies are produced. Influenza virus epidemics and epizootics are associated with changes in their antigenic structure.

Hemagglutinin (H) is an antigenic glycoprotein which binds to sialic acid receptors on the surface of the host cell, thereby mediating the entry of the virus into the host cell. Neuraminidase (N) is an antigenic glycosylated enzyme which facilitates the release of progeny viruses from infected cells. There are 18 known types of hemagglutinin, of which H1 thru H16 have been found in birds, and 11 types of neuraminidase.

=== Subtypes ===
Subtypes of influenza A are defined by the combination of H and N proteins in the viral envelope; for example, "H5N1" designates an influenza A subtype that has a type-5 hemagglutinin (H) protein and a type-1 neuraminidase (N) protein. The subtyping scheme only takes into account the two envelope proteins, not the other proteins coded by the virus' RNA. Almost all possible combinations of H (1 thru 16) and N (1 thru 11) have been isolated from wild birds. Further variations exist within the subtypes and can lead to very significant differences in the virus's ability to infect and cause disease.

=== Influenza virus nomenclature ===
Diagram of influenza nomenclature

To unambiguously describe a specific isolate of virus, researchers use the internationally accepted Influenza virus nomenclature, which describes, among other things, the species of animal from which the virus was isolated, and the place and year of collection. As an example, A/chicken/Nakorn-Patom/Thailand/CU-K2/04(H5N1):

- A stands for the genus of influenza (A, B or C)
- chicken is the animal species the isolate was found in (note: human isolates lack this component term and are thus identified as human isolates by default)
- Nakorn-Patom/Thailand is the place this specific virus was isolated
- CU-K2 is the laboratory reference number that identifies it from other influenza viruses isolated at the same place and year
- 04 represents the year of isolation 2004
- H5 stands for the fifth of several known types of the protein hemagglutinin
- N1 stands for the first of several known types of the protein neuraminidase.

Other examples include: A/duck/Hong Kong/308/78(H5N3), A/avian/NY/01(H5N2), A/chicken/Mexico/31381-3/94(H5N2), and A/shoveler/Egypt/03(H5N2).

=== Genetic characterization ===
Analysis of the virus' genome enables researchers to determine the order of its nucleotides. Comparison of the genome of a virus with that of a different virus can reveal differences between the two viruses. Genetic variations are important because they can change amino acids that make up the influenza virus’ proteins, resulting in structural changes to the proteins, and thereby altering properties of the virus. Some of these properties include the ability to evade immunity and the ability to cause severe disease.

Genetic sequencing enables influenza strains to be further characterised by their clade or subclade, revealing links between different samples of virus and tracing the evolution of the virus over time.

=== Species barrier ===
Humans can become infected by the avian flu if they are in close contact with infected birds. Symptoms vary from mild to severe (including death), but as of December 2024 there have been no observed instances of sustained human-human transmission.

There are a number of factors that generally prevent avian influenza viruses from causing epidemics in humans or other mammals.

- The viral HA protein of avian influenza binds to alpha-2,3 sialic acid receptors, which are present in the respiratory tract and intestines of avian species, while human influenza HA binds to alpha-2,6 sialic acid receptors, which are present in the human upper respiratory tract.
- The myxovirus resistance protein (Mx1) is an important antiviral restriction factor that inhibits the replication of avian influenza viruses in particular. Human-adapted strains of IAV display reduced sensitivity to human Mx1 compared with avian strains.
- Other factors include the ability to replicate the viral RNA genome within the host cell nucleus, and to transmit between individuals.

Influenza viruses are constantly changing as small genetic mutations accumulate, a process known as antigenic drift. Over time, mutation may lead to a change in antigenic properties such that host antibodies (acquired through vaccination or prior infection) do not provide effective protection, causing a fresh outbreak of disease.

The segmented genome of influenza viruses facilitates genetic reassortment. This can occur if a host is infected simultaneously with two different strains of influenza virus; then it is possible for the viruses to interchange genetic material as they reproduce in the host cells. Thus, an avian influenza virus can acquire characteristics, such as the ability to infect humans, from a different virus strain. The presence of both alpha 2,3 and alpha 2,6 sialic acid receptors in pig tissues allows for co-infection by avian influenza and human influenza viruses. This susceptibility makes pigs a potential "melting pot" for the reassortment of influenza A viruses.

== Epidemiology ==
=== History ===
Avian influenza (historically known as fowl plague) is caused by bird-adapted strains of the influenza type A virus. The disease was first identified by Edoardo Perroncito in 1878 when it was differentiated from other diseases that caused high mortality rates in birds; in 1955 it was established that the fowl plague virus was closely related to human influenza. In 1972, it became evident that many subtypes of avian flu were endemic in wild bird populations.

Between 1959 and 1995, there were 15 recorded outbreaks of highly pathogenic avian influenza (HPAI) in poultry, with losses varying from a few birds on a single farm to many millions. Between 1996 and 2008, HPAI outbreaks in poultry have been recorded at least 11 times and 4 of these outbreaks have resulted in the death or culling of millions of birds. Since then, several virus strains (both LPAI and HPAI) have become endemic among wild birds with increasingly frequent outbreaks among domestic poultry, especially of the H5 and H7 subtypes.

=== Transmission and prevention ===
The eight major flyways used by shorebirds (waders) on migration Pacific Mississippi and Amazon West Atlantic East Atlantic Mediterranean and Black Sea West Asia and Africa Central Asia and India East Asia and Australasia

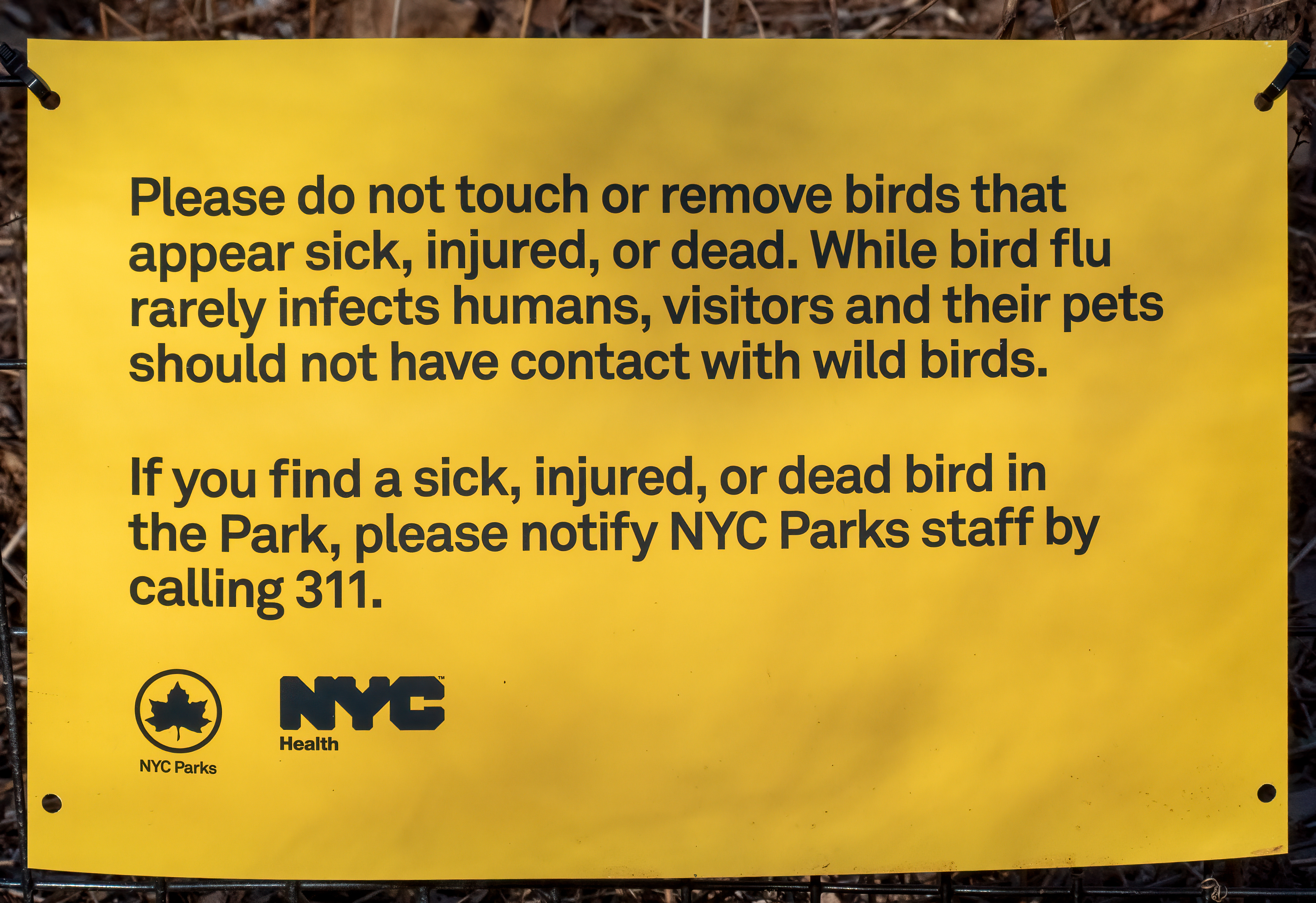
Sign in Central Park in New York City advising against handling birds

Birds – Influenza A viruses of various subtypes have a large reservoir in wild waterbirds of the orders Anseriformes (for example, ducks, geese, and swans) and Charadriiformes (for example, gulls, terns, and waders) which can infect the respiratory and gastrointestinal tract without affecting the health of the host. They can then be carried by the bird over large distances, especially during annual migration. Infected birds can shed avian influenza A viruses in their saliva, nasal secretions, and feces; susceptible birds become infected when they have contact with the virus as it is shed by infected birds. The virus can survive for long periods in water and at low temperatures, and can be spread from one farm to another on farm equipment. Domesticated birds (chickens, turkeys, ducks, etc.) may become infected with avian influenza A viruses through direct contact with infected waterfowl or other infected poultry, or through contact with contaminated feces or surfaces.

In 2024, the clade 2.3.4.4b H5N1 was documented causing high mortality in migratory shorebirds, particularly in sanderlings (Calidris alba) along the Atlantic coast of the United States. Affected birds exhibited severe brain and pancreatic damage, highlighting the vulnerability of some shorebird species to HPAI during migration stopovers.

Avian influenza outbreaks in domesticated birds are of concern for several reasons. There is potential for low pathogenic avian influenza viruses (LPAI) to evolve into strains which are high pathogenic to poultry (HPAI), and subsequent potential for significant illness and death among poultry during outbreaks. Because of this, international regulations state that any detection of H5 or H7 subtypes (regardless of their pathogenicity) must be notified to the appropriate authority. It is also possible that avian influenza viruses could be transmitted to humans and other animals which have been exposed to infected birds, causing infection with unpredictable but sometimes fatal consequences.

When an HPAI infection is detected in poultry, it is normal to cull infected animals and those nearby in an effort to rapidly contain, control and eradicate the disease. This is done together with movement restrictions, improved hygiene and biosecurity, and enhanced surveillance.

Humans – Avian flu viruses, both HPAI and LPAI, can infect humans who are in close, unprotected contact with infected poultry. Incidents of cross-species transmission are rare, with symptoms ranging in severity from no symptoms or mild illness, to severe disease that resulted in death. As of February 2024 there have been very few instances of human-to-human transmission, and each outbreak has been limited to a few people. All subtypes of avian Influenza A have potential to cross the species barrier, with H5N1 considered the biggest threat.

In order to avoid infection, the general public are advised to avoid contact with sick birds or potentially contaminated material such as carcasses or feces. People working with birds, such as conservationists or poultry workers, are advised to wear appropriate personal protection equipment.

Other animals – a wide range of other animals have been affected by avian flu, generally due to eating birds which had been infected. There have been instances where transmission of the disease between mammals, including seals and cows, may have occurred. In May 2026, highly pathogenic avian influenza (HPAI) was detected in a polar bear on Svalbard, marking the first confirmed case in Norway and Europe; the virus had previously been detected in a walrus in 2023 and in arctic foxes in 2025.

=== Pandemic potential ===
Influenza viruses have a relatively high mutation rate that is characteristic of RNA viruses. The segmentation of the influenza A virus genome facilitates genetic recombination by segment reassortment in hosts who become infected with two different strains of influenza viruses at the same time. With reassortment between strains, an avian strain which does not affect humans may acquire characteristics from a different strain which enable it to infect and pass between humans – a zoonotic event. It is thought that all influenza A viruses causing outbreaks or pandemics among humans since the 1900s originated from strains circulating in wild aquatic birds through reassortment with other influenza strains. It is possible (though not certain) that pigs may act as an intermediate host for reassortment.

As of January 2026, there is concern about the H5N1 subtype of avian influenza which is circulating in wild bird populations worldwide.

==== Influenza A virus subtype H5N1 ====
The highly pathogenic influenza A virus subtype H5N1 is an emerging avian influenza virus that is causing global concern as a potential pandemic threat. It is often referred to simply as "bird flu" or "avian influenza", even though it is only one of many subtypes.

A/H5N1 has killed millions of poultry in a growing number of countries throughout Asia, Europe, and Africa. Health experts are concerned that the coexistence of human flu viruses and avian flu viruses (especially H5N1) will provide an opportunity for genetic material to be exchanged between species-specific viruses, possibly creating a new virulent influenza strain that is easily transmissible and lethal to humans.

Between 2003 and December 2025, the World Health Organization has recorded 993 cases of confirmed H5N1 influenza, leading to 477 deaths. The true fatality rate is presumably lower because cases with mild symptoms may not have been identified as H5N1.

=== Surveillance ===
The Global Influenza Surveillance and Response System (GISRS) is a global network of laboratories that monitor the spread of influenza with the aim to provide the World Health Organization with influenza control information and to inform vaccine development. Several millions of specimens are tested by the GISRS network annually through a network of laboratories in 127 countries. As well as human viruses, GISRS monitors avian, swine, and other potentially zoonotic influenza viruses.

=== Vaccines ===
Poultry – it is possible to vaccinate poultry against specific strains of HPAI influenza. Vaccination should be combined with other control measures such as infection monitoring, early detection and biosecurity.

Humans – Several "candidate vaccines" are available in case an avian virus acquires the ability to infect and transmit among humans. There are strategic stockpiles of vaccines against the H5N1 subtype, which is considered the biggest risk. A vaccine against the H7N9 subtype, which has also infected humans, has undergone a limited amount of testing. In the event of an outbreak, the "candidate" vaccine would be rapidly tested for safety as well as efficacy against the zoonotic strain, and then authorised and distributed to vaccine manufacturers.

Zoonotic influenza vaccine Seqirus is authorized for use in the European Union. It is an H5N8 vaccine that is intended to provide acquired immunity against H5 subtype influenza A viruses.

In May 2025, the United States Department of Health and Human Services cancelled a $590 million contract with Moderna for the development of an mRNA bird flu vaccine, though Moderna indicated that it would seek other options to move forward, citing successful early clinical trials.

== Domestic animals ==
Several domestic species have been infected with and shown symptoms of H5N1 viral infection, including cats, dogs, ferrets, pigs, chickens and turkeys.

=== Poultry ===
Commercially important poultry species, including chickens, turkeys, and ducks, can be seriously affected by avian flu. Low pathogenic strains (LPAI) may be controlled by vaccination. An outbreak of a highly pathogenic strain (HPAI) on a poultry farm can lead to devastating consequences, including mortality rates approaching 100%, consequent economic losses, and potential risks to both animal and human health. When a highly pathogenic strain (HPAI) is detected on a farm, the immediate response involves strict biosecurity measures and, in most cases, slaughter of the affected flock to prevent further spread. A general lack of genetic diversity in commercial poultry, which are often maintained in crowded conditions, makes them particularly vulnerable to avian flu.

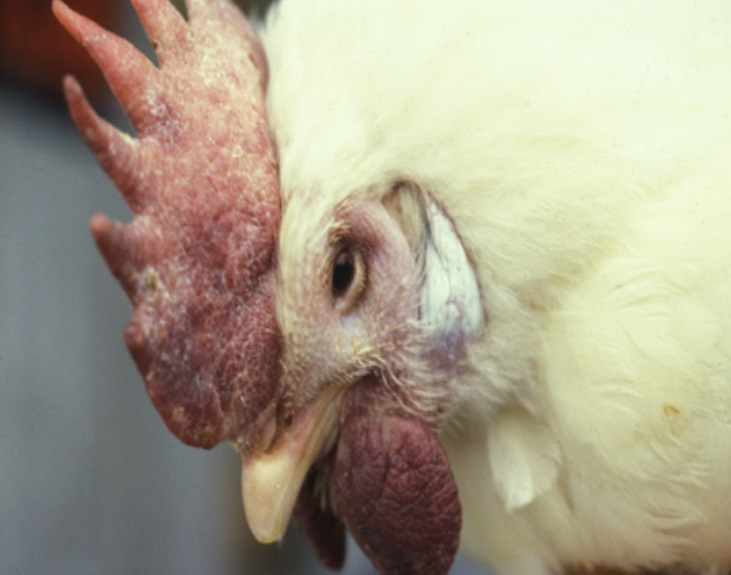
Birds affected by highly pathogenic avian influenza (HPAI) could show swelling of the head, wattles, combs, and face. USDA photo.

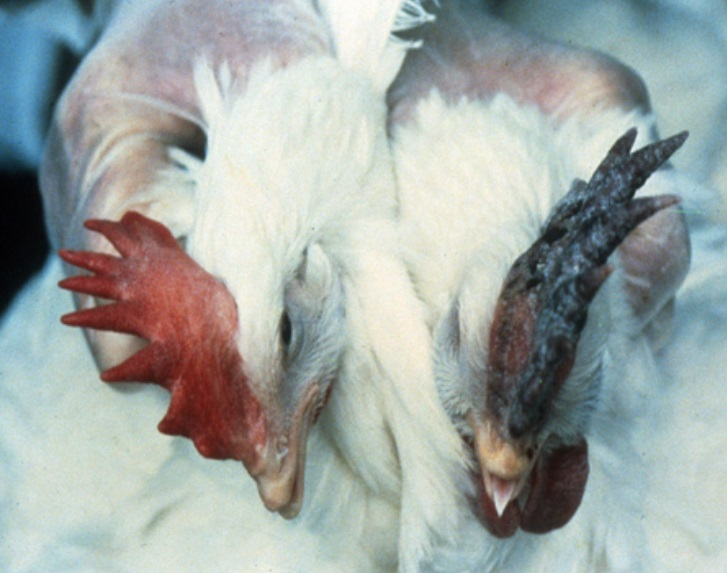
Purple discoloration of the comb could indicate highly pathogenic avian influenza (HPAI). USDA photo.

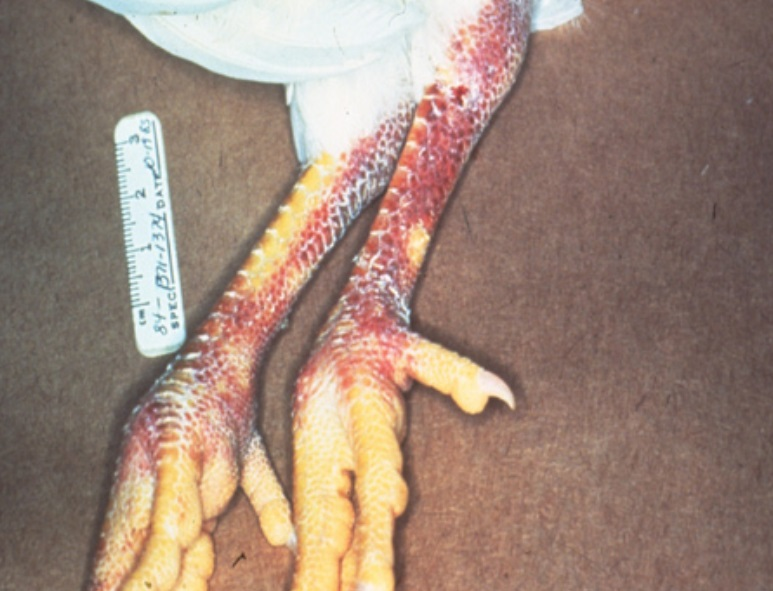
Hemorrhaging of the skin and legs is just one of the signs birds might exhibit when infected with the highly pathogenic avian influenza (HPAI) virus. USDA photo.

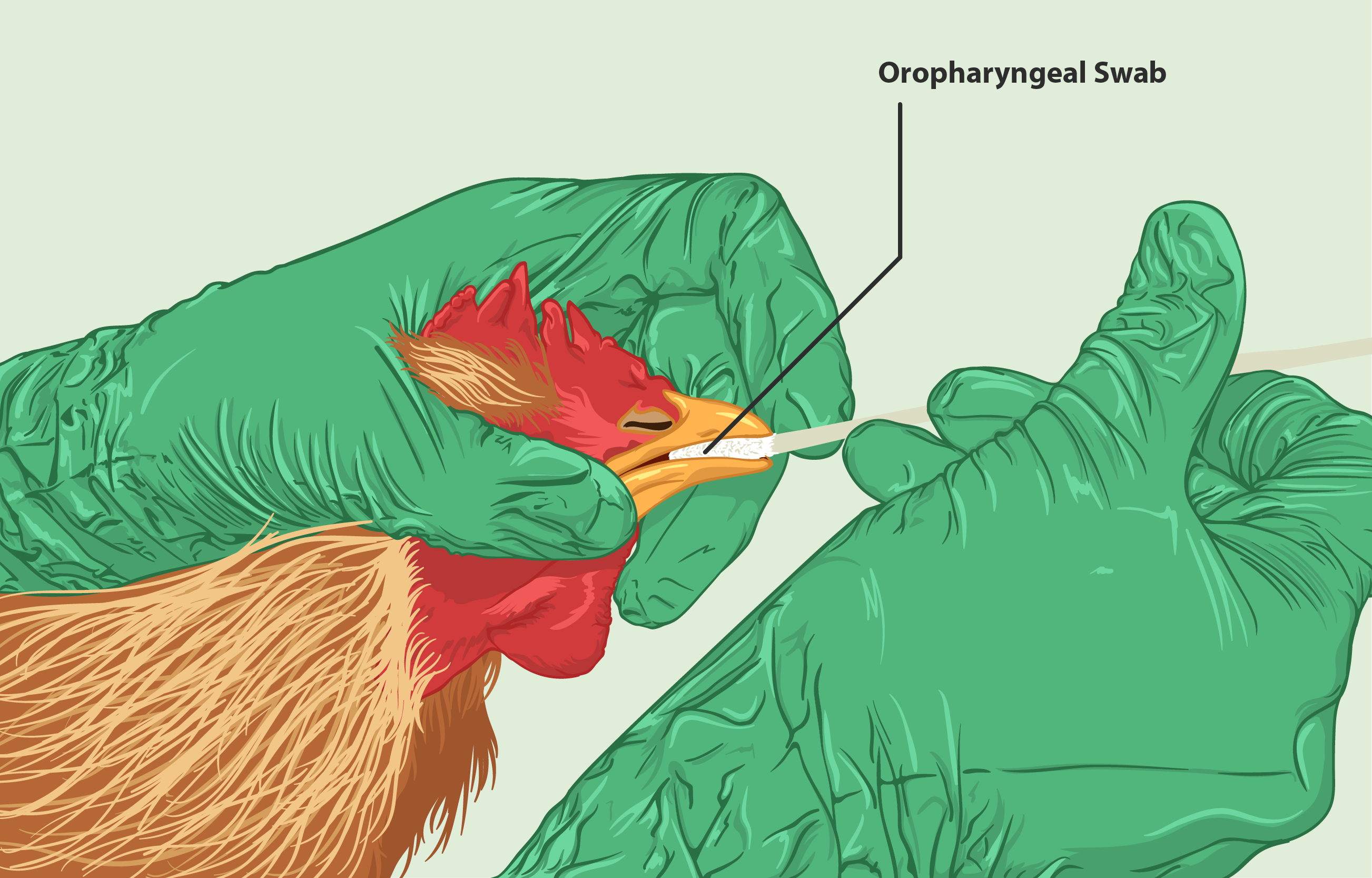
A chicken being tested for flu

=== Dairy cows ===
During April 2024, avian influenza was first detected in dairy cows in several US states and subsequently spread more widely through the year. Influenza A(H5N1) was found to be present at high levels in the mammary glands and in the milk of affected cows. It was shown that the virus can persist on milking equipment, which provides a probable transmission route for cow-to-cow and cow-to-human spread. A number of humans who had been in contact with cows tested positive for the virus, with mild symptoms. According to CDC, 7% of 115 dairy workers had evidence of recent infection in a study from Michigan and Colorado from June to August 2024 – half of them asymptomatic. This is higher than estimates from prior transmission studies in poultry. All dairy workers had worked in cleaning the milk parlor and none had used personal protective equipment.

In February 2025, a second type of avian flu, named D1.1, was confirmed in cattle in Nevada, besides the B3.13 circulating in cattle since late 2023, which has infected more than 950 herds in 16 states. This new strain had been present in poultry and "more than a dozen people exposed to poultry" causing mild symptoms but was also found in a dairy worker in Churchill County, Nevada.

=== Cats ===
Cats with avian influenza exhibit symptoms that can result in death. The avian influenza viruses cats may get include H5N1 or H7N2, notable pathogenic subtypes of the virus. In order to get the virus, a cat would need to be in contact with infected waterfowl, poultry, or uncooked poultry. Two of the main organs that the virus affects are the lungs and liver. In May 2024, two indoor-only cats living in Michigan developed avian flu and died. Their owners were dairy farm workers who had symptoms of H5N1 bird flu before their cats, but did not want to be tested.

== Global aspects ==
=== Global measures ===
In 2005, the formation of the International Partnership on Avian and Pandemic Influenza was announced in order to elevate the importance of avian flu, coordinate efforts, and improve disease reporting and surveillance in order to better respond to future pandemics. New networks of laboratories have emerged to detect and respond to avian flu, such as the Crisis Management Center for Animal Health, the Global Avian Influenza Network for Surveillance, OFFLU, and the Global Early Warning System for major animal diseases. After the 2003 outbreak, WHO member states have also recognized the need for more transparent and equitable sharing of vaccines and other benefits from these networks. Cooperative measures created in response to HPAI have served as a basis for programs related to other emerging and re-emerging infectious diseases.

=== Impact on national policies ===
HPAI control has also been used for political ends. In Indonesia, negotiations with global response networks were used to recentralize power and funding to the Ministry of Health. In Vietnam, policymakers, with the support of the Food and Agriculture Organization of the United Nations (FAO), used HPAI control to accelerate the industrialization of livestock production for export by proposing to increase the portion of large-scale commercial farms and reducing the number of poultry keepers from 8 to 2 million by 2010.

=== Traditional Asian practices ===
Backyard poultry production was viewed as "traditional Asian" agricultural practices that contrasted with modern commercial poultry production and seen as a threat to biosecurity. Backyard production appeared to hold greater risk than commercial production due to lack of biosecurity and close contact with humans, though HPAI spread in intensively raised flocks was greater due to high density rearing and genetic homogeneity. Asian culture itself was blamed as the reason why certain interventions, such as those that only looked at place-based interventions, would fail without looking for multifaceted solutions.

=== Economic impact ===
Avian influenza (AI), or bird flu, has significantly impacted the poultry industry with economic ramifications felt globally. The virus primarily affects poultry species, and when outbreaks occur, large-scale culling of infected birds is often necessary to prevent further spread. These measures disrupt egg production, causing supply shortages that directly lead to higher egg prices. For instance, during the 2022 avian influenza outbreaks, particularly in the U.S., millions of egg-laying hens were culled. As egg production diminished, prices surged, placing a financial burden on consumers and businesses reliant on eggs for food production. When egg prices increase, this low-cost source of animal proteins become less available to low-income consumers, making them the hardest hit. In February 2025, to combat avian influenza, the USDA created a five-pronged strategy to combat highly pathogenic avian influenza and lower egg prices. This included strengthening biosecurity measures, expediting relief for farmers to accelerate repopulation, reducing regulatory burdens to expand supply and lower prices, investing $100 million in avian flu research and vaccine development, and exploring temporary import-export adjustments to stabilize supply. Through this, the New York wholesale egg prices that peaked at $8.53 per dozen steadily declined to $4.08 from 26 February, to 19 March 2025.

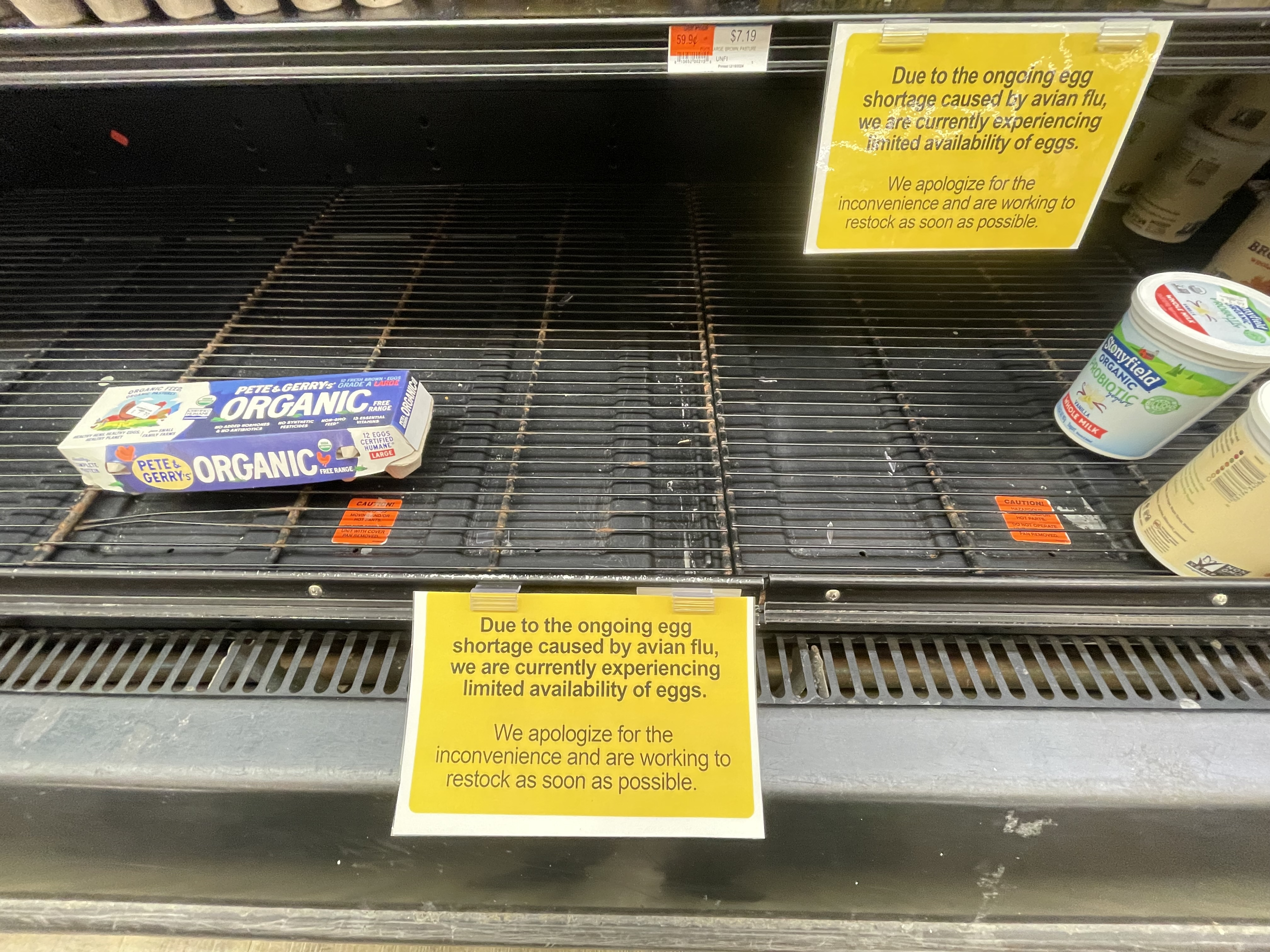
Egg shortage at a local supermarket in Brooklyn, New York in February 2025, caused by the 2020–2025 H5N1 outbreak

Approximately 20% of the protein consumed in developing countries come from poultry. A report by FAO totalled economic losses caused by avian influenza in South East Asia up to 2005 around US$10 billion. This had the greatest impact on small scale commercial and backyard producers.

As poultry serves as a source of food security and liquid assets, the most vulnerable populations were poor, small scale farmers. The loss of birds due to HPAI and culling in Vietnam led to an average loss of 2.3 months of production and US$69–108 for households where many have an income of $2 a day or less. The loss of food security for vulnerable households can be seen in the stunting of children under five in Egypt. Women are another population at risk as in most regions of the world, small flocks are tended to by women. Widespread culling also resulted in the decreased enrollment of girls in school in Turkey.

== See also ==
- Influenza pandemic
- Influenza Genome Sequencing Project
