= Avian influenza in cats =

Cats with avian influenza exhibit symptoms that can result in death. The avian influenza viruses cats may get include H5N1 or H7N2, notable pathogenic subtypes of the virus. In order to get the virus, a cat would need to be in contact with infected waterfowl, poultry, or uncooked poultry. Two of the main organs that the virus affects are the lungs and liver. In May 2024, two indoor-only cats living in Michigan developed avian flu and died. Their owners were dairy farm workers who had symptoms of H5N1 bird flu before their cats, but did not want to be tested.

== History ==
Avian influenza has been found in China, Thailand, Vietnam, Indonesia, Iraq, Austria, Germany, and Poland. Besides being found in domestic cats, the virus has infected a variety of wild cats such as the Asiatic golden cat, the clouded leopard, tigers, and leopards. In 2024, twenty big cats died due to an outbreak in a sanctuary in the United States.

H5N1 was first discovered in domestic and wild cats in Asia in 2002, specifically in 2003 in the Thai zoo where two tigers and two leopards died. In 2004, the Thai zoo had 147 tigers that died or were euthanized. This was then followed by an outbreak in Germany in 2006, where three stray cats were found to be either dying or dead during the peak time of the virus outbreak. As of June 2023, there was an ongoing outbreak in Poland with at least 9 confirmed cases and multiple deaths. In May 2024, two indoor-only cats living in Michigan developed avian flu and died. Their owners were dairy farm workers who had symptoms of H5N1 bird flu before their cats, but did not want to be tested.

In December 2024, 20 big cats in a wildlife sanctuary in Shelton, Washington died from the infection. Also in December 2024, Los Angeles County public health officials detected H5N1 in cats that had consumed raw milk that had been recalled due to an outbreak, indicating that the virus can be transmitted between mammal species via milk consumption. President Trump's communications ban on CDC had held the MMWR report back initially.

From December 2024 to February 2025, three cats in Iceland were diagnosed with H5N5.

Because the virus infects the lungs of cats, it is one of the preferred model animals to study the effects of H5N1 in humans.

== Virus transmission ==
Avian influenza is a zoonotic agent. The most common way a cat can obtain H5N1 is by consuming an infected bird. This has been studied in the 2006 and 2007 cases in Germany and Austria, where the strains between the cat and the infected birds were not different between the species. A cat is able to then transfer the virus via the respiratory tract and the digestive tract to other cats. However, studies suggest that a cat cannot transfer the virus to a dog, and vice versa, while sharing a food bowl. Though there was no concrete evidence as of 2010, there is a potential link between the transmission of the virus between poultry, wild birds, and humans.

Once the cat is infected, after an incubation period of 2 to 3 days, the virus can be found in the respiratory tissues, attached to the type II pneumocytes and alveolar macrophages, as well as the intestinal tissues. In some cases where the virus has been found in the brain and other systems in the body.

== Studies in cats ==
One epidemiological study, conducted in Germany and Austria in 2008, found that out of 171 living cats tested, fewer than 1.8% had H5N1. Of the same sample, fewer than 2.6% had antibodies to H5N1. Even though Germany and Austria are among the countries that have had naturally occurring cases, this study shows that very few cats have contracted the disease and survived.

There have also been studies looking at the T cells, specifically CD4 and CD8, in the cat after viral infection. Though the mechanism is not fully known, there seems to be an inverse relationship with the amount of T cells present and the amount of infected cells.

Another study to test whether the ALVAC recombinant canarypox virus could prime the cat immune system was performed. This vaccine has the same hemagglutinin as the H5N1 virus, and therefore worked on preventing death from two different strains of the virus, HPAIV A/Vietnam/1194/2004 and HPAIV A/Indonesia/05/2005. However, some of the cats that were vaccinated did exhibit hyperthermia and weight loss, and all of the cats did have some disease change (assuming lesions) in their lungs. All of the cats, except one, still excreted the virus even after being vaccinated.

== Symptoms ==
A cat that is infected with a high dose of the virus can show signs of fever, lethargy, and dyspnea. There have even been recorded cases where a cat has neurological symptoms such as circling or ataxia. In a case in February 2004, a 2-year-old male cat that had eaten a pigeon was panting and convulsing on top of having a fever two days prior to death. This cat also had lesions that were identified as renal congestion, pulmonary congestion, edema, and pneumonia. Upon inspection, the cat also had cerebral congestion, conjunctivitis, and hemorrhaging in the serosae of the intestines.

However, a cat that is infected with a low dose of the virus may not necessarily show symptoms. Though they may be asymptomatic, they can still transfer small amounts of the virus.

== Treatment and prevention ==
There is currently no commercial vaccine to prevent or treat H5N1 in cats.

If a cat is exhibiting symptoms, they should be put into isolation and kept indoors. Then they should be taken to a vet to get tested for the presence of H5N1. If there is a possibility that the cat has avian influenza, then there should be extra care when handling the cat. Some of the precautions include avoiding all direct contact with the cat by wearing gloves, masks, and goggles. Whatever surfaces the cat comes in contact with should be disinfected with standard household cleaners.

Researchers have given tigers an antiviral treatment of oseltamivir with a dose of 75 mg/60 kg two times a day. The specific dosage was extrapolated from human data, but no data exist to suggest protection. As with many antiviral treatments, the dosage depends on the species.
