= Berna Biotech =

Swiss vaccine manufacturer

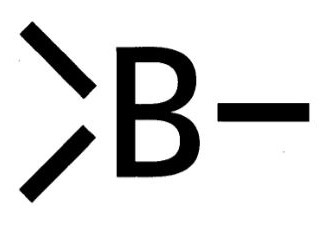
- Formerly: Schweizerisches Serum- und Impfinstitut Bern (1898–2001)
- Type: Joint-stock company
- Industry: Pharmaceuticals, vaccines
- Founded: 1898 in Bern, Switzerland
- Founder: Charles Haccius, Johann Friedrich Häfliger, Albert Vogt
- Fate: Acquired by Crucell (2006), later Johnson & Johnson (2011)
- Headquarters: Bern, Switzerland
- Products: Bacterial and viral vaccines, plasma derivatives, pharmaceutical and veterinary products
- Number of employees: 850 worldwide (2004)

Berna Biotech AG, historically the Schweizerisches Serum- und Impfinstitut Bern (French: Institut sérothérapique et vaccinal suisse Berne; English: Swiss Serum and Vaccine Institute Bern), known as Berna, was a Swiss vaccine manufacturer based in Bern. Its activities centered on the development, production, and distribution of immunobiological preparations—bacterial and viral vaccines and plasma derivatives—as well as pharmaceutical and veterinary products.

== History ==
The company was formed in 1898 from the merger of the Institut Vaccinal Suisse at Lancy (founded in 1883) and the firm Häfliger, Vogt & Cie in Bern (founded in 1895). Under its founders Charles Haccius, Johann Friedrich Häfliger, and Albert Vogt, the new institute quickly made a name for itself by producing a smallpox vaccine, followed by vaccines against epidemic diseases—including diphtheria, cholera, poliomyelitis, typhus, meningitis, hepatitis, and influenza—as well as products for emergency medicine and veterinary care.

The intranasal influenza vaccine Nasalflu produced by Berna Biotech and used during the years 2000 and 2001 was found to have a strong association with cases of Bell's palsy. The vaccine had been withdrawn in 2002 due to concerns about a link to the disease.

Through intensive research, including in the most recent technologies such as genetic engineering, and continual development of its products, the institute gained access to world markets, particularly through subsidiaries in Europe, Argentina, and Korea, and through international organizations such as UNICEF and the WHO. The company was renamed Berna Biotech AG in 2001 and had 850 employees worldwide in 2004, including 400 in Switzerland. In 2006 it was taken over by the Dutch firm Crucell, and in 2011 Crucell Switzerland AG was acquired by the American group Johnson & Johnson.

== Bibliography ==
- Schweizerisches Serum- & Impfinstitut Bern (Berna), [1959]
- 75 Jahre Schweizerisches Serum- & Impfinstitut Bern (Berna), 1898–1973, 1973
- Berna, 1998
