= Janssen Vaccines =

Biotechnology subsidiary of Johnson & Johnson

Coordinates: 52.1655°N 4.4673°E

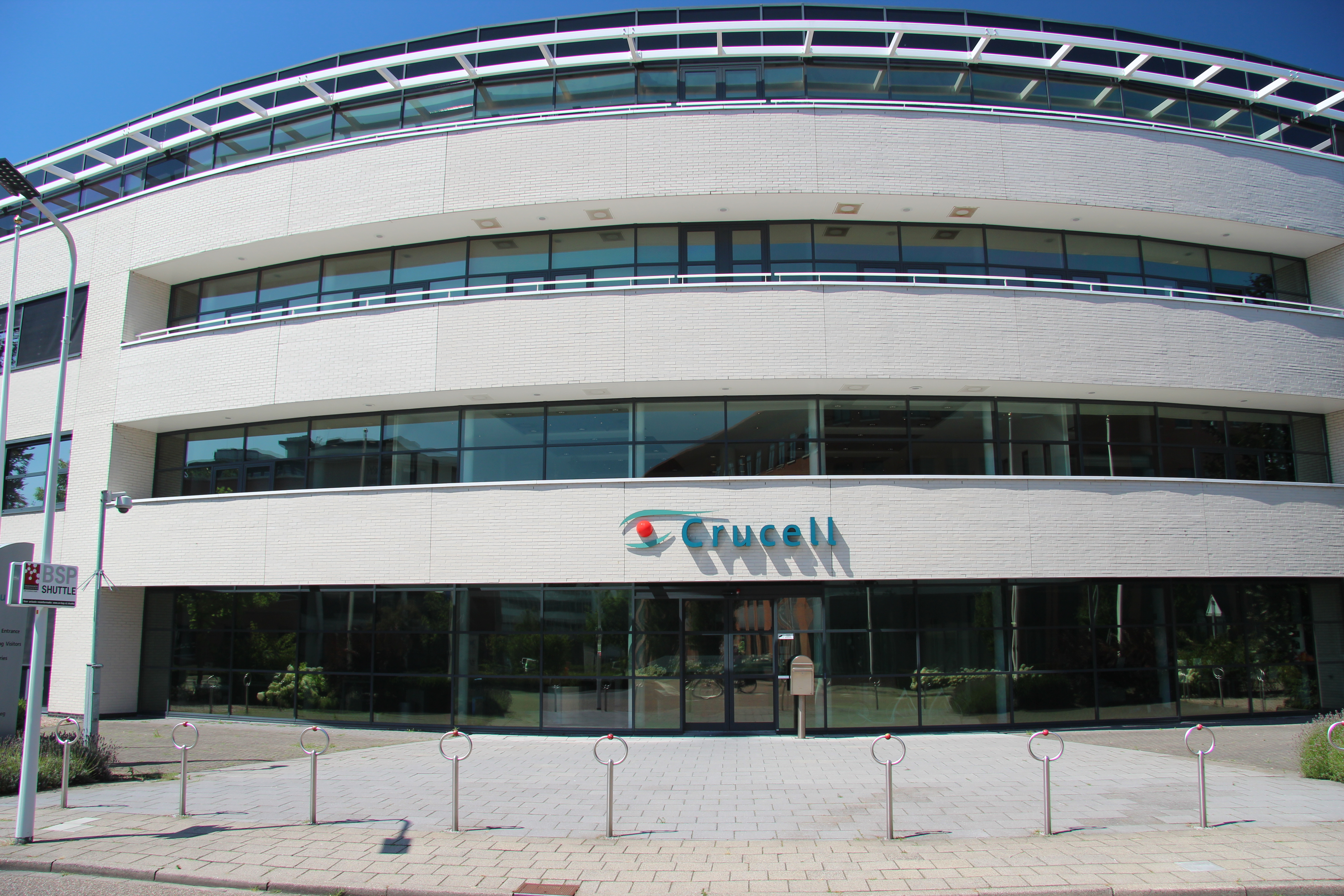
- Formerly: Crucell
- Company type: Subsidiary
- Industry: Biotechnology
- Founded: 2000; 26 years ago
- Headquarters: Archimedesweg 4, Leiden, Netherlands
- Key people: Ronald Brus (CEO); Jan Pieter Oosterveld (chairman of the supervisory board)
- Products: Vaccines and antibodies
- Parent: Johnson & Johnson
- Website: www.janssen.com

Janssen Vaccines, formerly Crucell, is a biotechnology company specializing in vaccines and biopharmaceutical technologies. It was formed when Johnson & Johnson acquired the Dutch biotech company Crucell. Janssen Vaccines is part of Johnson & Johnson Innovative Medicine business segment.

== History ==
In 1993 Introgene, Crucell's predecessor, was established as a spin-off of Leiden University. The company formed a partnership with Genzyme to collaborate on its vector technology and viral-based products. In 1999 the company founded Galapagos Genomics as a joint venture together with Tibotec. In 2000 IntroGene acquired U-Bisys to form Crucell.

In 2006, Crucell and Swiss Berna Biotech; Swedish SBL Vaccines and US-based Berna Products joined forces to become the sixth largest vaccine company worldwide, with their own clinical programs.

On 7 January 2009 Crucell released a press release saying Crucell and Wyeth were in discussion on a merger of the two companies. On 26 January 2009 Crucell released another press release saying the discussions on a combination of Crucell and Wyeth was discontinued due to Pfizer's acquisition of Wyeth.

In September 2009 Johnson & Johnson bought 18% stake in Crucell for €302 million in order to collaborate on the development of a flu vaccine. This followed Crucell's discovery of CR6261, a potent human antibody that neutralizes a broad range of influenza A viruses. J&J acquired the rest of the company in October 2010, taking its stake to over 95% by February 2011 and delisting the company from stock exchanges two months later.

After the takeover by Johnson & Johnson in 2011, Crucell was assigned to Janssen Pharmaceuticals division. In 2014, the subsidiary was renamed from Crucell to Janssen Vaccines.

=== COVID-19 vaccine development ===
Janssen Vaccines in Leiden developed the COVID-19 vaccines for Johnson & Johnson. Initial production of the vaccine is happening at Janssen Biotech in Leiden, Netherlands. The vaccine stands out because it is the first single-shot vaccine against COVID-19 that was developed during the COVID-19 pandemic.
