= FI6 (antibody) =

FI6 is an antibody that targets a protein found on the surface of all influenza A viruses called hemagglutinin. FI6 is the only known antibody found to bind all 16 subtypes of the influenza A virus hemagglutinin and is hoped to be useful for universal influenza virus therapy.

The antibody binds to the F domain HA trimer, and prevents the virus from attaching to the host cell. The antibody has been refined in order to remove any excess, unstable mutations that could negatively affect its neutralising ability, and this new version of the antibody has been termed "FI6v3"

== Research ==
Researchers from Britain and Switzerland have previously found antibodies that work in Group 1 influenza A viruses or against most Group 2 viruses (CR8020), but not against both.

This team developed a method using single-cell screening to test very large numbers of human plasma cells, to increase their odds of finding an antibody even if it was extremely rare. When they identified FI6, they injected it into mice and ferrets and found that it protected the animals against infection by either a Group 1 or Group 2 influenza A virus.

Scientists screened 104,000 peripheral-blood plasma cells from eight recently infected or vaccinated donors for antibodies that recognize each of three diverse influenza strains: H1N1 (swine-origin) and H5N1 and H7N7 (highly pathogenic avian influenzas.) From one donor, they isolated four plasma cells that produced an identical antibody, which they called FI6. This antibody binds all 16 HA subtypes, neutralizes infection, and protects mice and ferrets from lethal infection. The most broadly reactive antibodies that had previously been discovered recognized either one group of HA subtypes or the other, highlighting how remarkable FI6 is in its ability to target the gamut of influenza subtypes.

== Clinical implication ==
Researchers determined the crystal structure of the FI6 antibody when it was bound to H1 and H3 HA proteins. Sitting atop the HA spike is a globular head domain that binds to cellular receptors during viral entry and contains the major antigenic sites targeted by the immune system. Because of this selective pressure, the sequence in the head domain drifts enough to require an updated seasonal vaccine most years. A stalk domain connects the head to the viral membrane and is responsible for fusing viral and host membranes so that the pathogen can invade human cells. The immune system usually does not have a strong response to the partially hidden stalk domain, so portions of the stalk remain highly conserved across all influenza subtypes. The FI6 antibody makes extensive contact with conserved parts of the stalk, thereby blocking HA from harpooning a sticky fusion peptide into the host membrane during viral entry.

The FI6 provides scientists with a broadly neutralizing antibody that recognizes all 16 HA subtypes, including emerging ones, such as H5N1. But, because the replication of the influenza virus is somewhat error-prone, the virus evolves as a quasispecies, and widespread use of antiviral drugs can lead to resistant strains. Such has been the case for oseltamivir and for the M2 ion channel blocker amantadine. Therefore, before considering FI6 as a long-term prophylactic or therapeutic agent against seasonal influenza, we would first have to determine whether the influenza virus could quickly mutate the epitope targeted by FI6 and escape recognition by FI6 after exposure.

A more important clinical implication of this work is the identification of a universal neutralizing epitope in the HA stalk at the atomic level an important intellectual landmark for the development of a universal influenza vaccine. In the absence of the immunodominant head domain, isolated portions of the HA stalk that include the FI6 epitope and have already been shown to stimulate broad, but not universal, protective effects against H1N1 and H3N2 strains in vaccinated animals. Using protein engineering and adjuvants to focus the immune system on the FI6 epitope may be the critical next step along the path to a universal vaccine.

== See also ==
- Universal flu vaccine
