= CR6261 =

Monoclonal antibody

Monoclonal antibody
- Type: ?
- Source: Human
- Target: Influenza A hemagglutinin

Clinical data
- Pregnancy category: N/A
- ATC code: none

Legal status
- Legal status: Investigational (animal studies)

Identifiers
- PubChem SID: 194161622
- ChemSpider: none
- ChEMBL: ChEMBL3137350

CR6261 is a monoclonal antibody that binds to a broad range of the influenza virus including the 1918 "Spanish flu" (SC1918/H1) and to a virus of the H5N1 class of avian influenza that jumped from chickens to a human in Vietnam in 2004 (Viet04/H5). In contrast to most antibodies generated by exposure to influenza, which can only neutralize a few strains from within a single virus subtype, CR6261 neutralizes numerous strains from multiple subtypes. CR6261 recognizes a highly conserved helical region in the membrane-proximal stem of hemagglutinin, the predominant protein on the surface of the influenza virus. Based upon the conservation of the amino acid sequence on this part of hemagglutinin, CR6261 is predicted to neutralize roughly 50% of all flu viruses. It was found by The Scripps Research Institute and the Dutch biopharmaceutical company, Crucell.

== See also ==
- Immunology
