= F-16 Rachanon =

Thai Muay Thai fighter (born 1991)

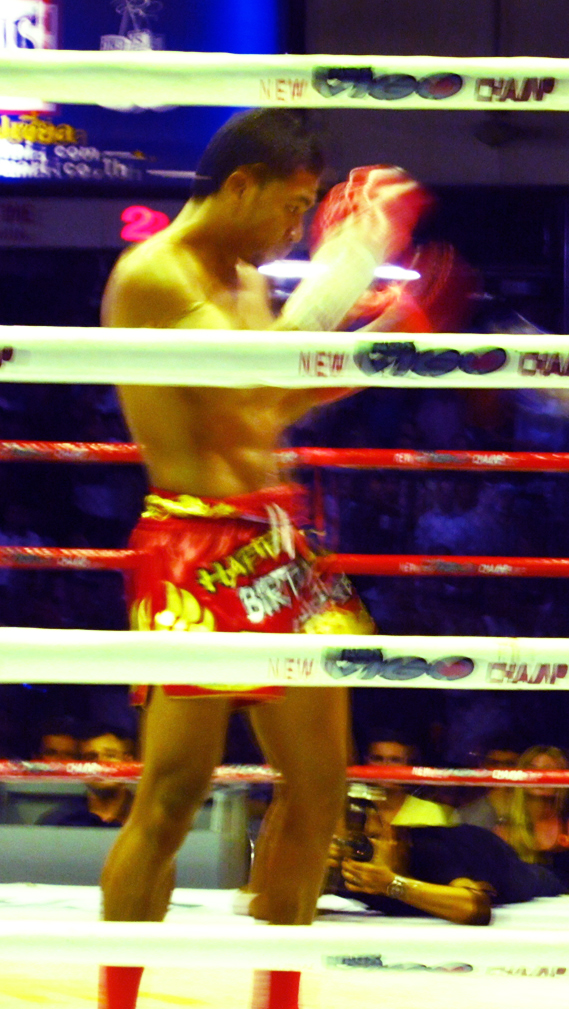
- F-16 Rachanon at Lumpini Stadium
- Born: August 14, 1991 (age 35); Lahan Sai District, Buriram province, Thailand
- Native name: Worawut Phakdipinit
- Other names: F-16 J-powerroofPhuket "jojo"
- Height: 1.70 m (5 ft 7 in)
- Weight: 61.0 kg (134 lb; 9 st 8 lb)
- Style: Muay Khao
- Fighting out of: Bangkok, Thailand
- Team: Rachanon
- Trainer: Kukkong Kiatpraphat

F-16 Rachanon (Thai: เอฟ 16 ราชานนท์) is a Thai professional Muay Thai fighter.

== Biography and career ==
F16 Ratchanon was born as Worawut Phakdipinit in Lahansai District, Buriram Province on August 4, 1991. He began training in Muay Thai at the age of nine, using the name Kongchaidan Sor.Phranchumphon.

On September 9, 2010, F16 lost to Arunchai Kiatpataraphan by decision at the Rajadamnern Stadium.

on October 7, 2011, at a Petchyindee promoted event in the Lumpinee Boxing Stadium, F16 defeated Nong O Kaiyang Ha Dao Gym by decision.

== Titles and achievements ==
- Professional Boxing Association of Thailand (PAT)
  - 2011 Thailand 135 lbs Champion
- Lumpinee Stadium
  - 2011 Lumpinee StadiumSuper Faetherweight (130 lbs) Champion

== Fight record ==
Muay Thai record
Date	Result	Opponent	Event	Location	Method	Round	Time
2019-06-06	Win	(Thailand) Krabuelek OrBorTor.Kampee	Rajadamnern Stadium	Bangkok, Thailand	KO	3	
2019-04-22	Loss	(Thailand) Sudyod Por.Pantida	Rajadamnern Stadium	Bangkok, Thailand	Decision	5	3:00
2017-	Loss	(Sweden) Christian	Max Muay Thai	Pattaya, Thailand	Decision	3	3:00
2015-12-03	Win	(Brazil) Carlos Sitmonchai	Rajadamnern Stadium	Bangkok, Thailand	KO	1	
2015-05-24	Loss	(Poland) Pawel Jedrzejczyk	Max Muay Thai	Pattaya, Thailand	Decision	3	3:00
2012-09-07	Loss	(Thailand) Capitan Petchyindee Academy	Lumpinee Stadium	Bangkok, Thailand	TKO	5	
2012-07-31	Loss	(Thailand) Capitan Petchyindee Academy	Lumpinee Stadium	Bangkok, Thailand	KO (High Kick)	3	
2012-05-04	Loss	(Thailand) Yodthuanthong Petchyindee Academy	Lumpinee Champion Krikkrai, Lumpinee Stadium	Bangkok, Thailand	Decision	5	3:00
2012-03-12	Loss	(Thailand) Nong-O Gaiyanghadao	Rajadamnern Stadium	Bangkok, Thailand	Decision	5	3:00
2012-02-	Loss	(Thailand) Yodtuantong PetchyindeeAcademy		Bangkok, Thailand	Decision	5	3:00
2012-01-	Win	(Thailand) Yodtuantong PetchyindeeAcademy		Bangkok, Thailand	Decision	5	3:00
2011-12-09	Loss	(Thailand) Singdam Kiatmuu9	Lumpinee Stadium	Bangkok, Thailand	TKO (kicks)	4	3:00
2011-10-07	Win	(Thailand) Nong-O Gaiyanghadao	Lumpinee Stadium	Bangkok, Thailand	Decision	5	3:00
2011-09-06	Win	(Thailand) Kongsak P.K. Saenchai Muaythaigym	Lumpinee Stadium	Bangkok, Thailand	Decision	5	3:00
Wins the Lumpinee StadiumSuper Faetherweight (130 lbs) title.
2011-08-02	Loss	(Thailand) Kongsak P.K. Saenchai Muaythaigym	Lumpinee Stadium	Bangkok, Thailand	Decision	5	3:00
2011-07-07	Win	(Thailand) Nong-O Gaiyanghadao	Rajadamnern Stadium	Bangkok, Thailand	Decision	5	3:00
2011-05-26	Win	(Thailand) Traijak Sitjomtrai	Rajadamnern Stadium	Bangkok, Thailand	Decision	5	3:00
2011-05-03	Win	(Thailand) Tuakatatong Phetpayatai	Lumpinee Stadium	Bangkok, Thailand	Decision	5	3:00
2011-04-02	Win	(Thailand) Arunchai Kiatpataraphan	Omnoi Stadium	Samut Sakhon, Thailand	Decision	5	3:00
2011-03-01	Win	(Thailand) Arunchai Kiatpataraphan	Lumpinee Stadium	Bangkok, Thailand	Decision	5	3:00
Wins the Thailand 135 lbs title.
2011-01-11	Loss	(Thailand) Parnpetch Chor Na Patalung	Lumpinee Stadium	Bangkok, Thailand	Decision	5	3:00
2010-12-06	Win	(Thailand) Petchtanong Phetfergus	Lumpinee Stadium	Bangkok, Thailand	Decision	5	3:00
2010-11-03	Win	(Thailand) Petchtanong Phetfergus	Lumpinee Stadium	Bangkok, Thailand	Decision	5	3:00
2010-09-09	Loss	(Thailand) Arunchai Kiatpataraphan	Rajadamnern Stadium	Bangkok, Thailand	Decision	5	3:00
2010-07-13	Loss	(Thailand) Wuttidet Lukprabat	Ruamnamjai Wongkarnmuay, Lumpinee Stadium	Bangkok, Thailand	Decision	5	3:00
2010-	Win	(Thailand) Traijak Sitjomtrai		Bangkok, Thailand	Decision	5	3:00
2010-02-16	Win	(Thailand) Lerdsila Chumpairtour	Por.Pramook Fight, Lumpinee Stadium	Bangkok, Thailand	Decision	5	3:00
2009-12-29	Loss	(Thailand) Pornsanae Sitmonchai	Lumpinee Stadium	Bangkok, Thailand	TKO (Low kicks)	3	
2009-12-04	Win	(Thailand) Weerayuth Lookpetnoi	Lumpinee Stadium	Bangkok, Thailand	Decision	5	3:00
2009-10-30	Loss	(Thailand) Pettaksin Sor Thumpet	Lumpinee Stadium	Bangkok, Thailand	Decision	5	3:00
2009-08-18	Win	(Thailand) Sitthichai Sitsongpeenong	Paianun Fight, Lumpinee Stadium	Bangkok, Thailand	Decision	5	3:00
2009-07-24	Win	(Thailand) Yodchat Fairtex	Lumpinee Stadium	Bangkok, Thailand	Decision	5	3:00
2009-07-01	Win	(Thailand) Worachart Or Nuangjamnong		Bangkok, Thailand	Decision	5	3:00
2009-03-31	Loss	(Thailand) Pettaksin Sor Thumpet	Lumpinee Stadium	Bangkok, Thailand	Decision	5	3:00
2009-02-06	Win	(Thailand) Fahmongkon Kor Chaipayom		Bangkok, Thailand	Decision	5	3:00
2009-01-06	Draw	(Thailand) Fahmongkon Kor Chaipayom		Bangkok, Thailand	Decision	5	3:00
2008-03-20	Win	(Japan) Masahiro Yamamoto	AJKF: Kick On!	Tokyo, Japan	TKO (Doctor stoppage)	4	0:19
Legend: Win Loss Draw/No contest Notes
