= Paweł Jędrzejczyk =

Polish sportsperson

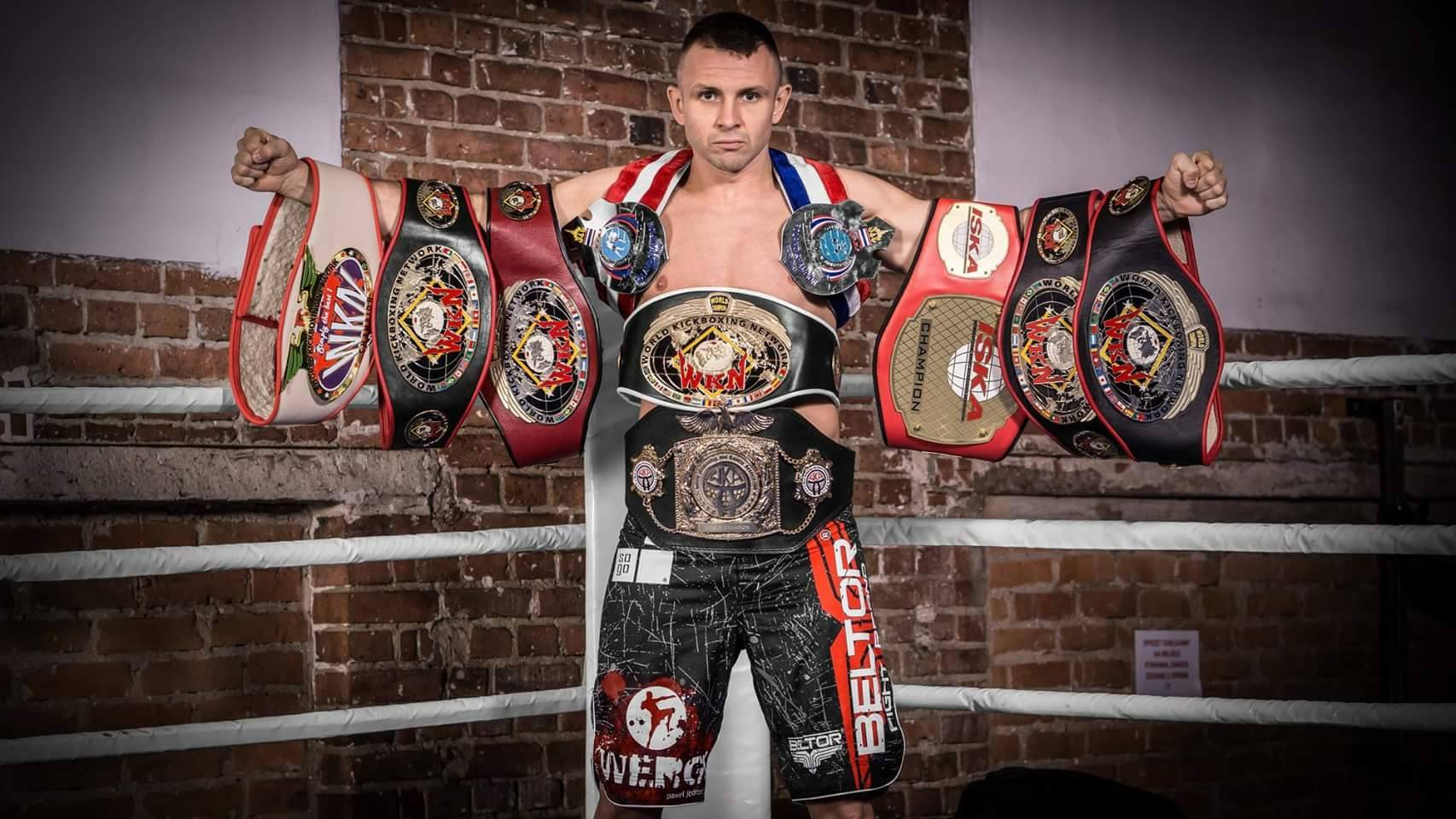
- Born: November 15, 1980 (age 45); Wrocław, Poland
- Native name: Paweł Jędrzejczyk
- Other names: Wergi
- Nationality: Polish
- Height: 1.80 m (5 ft 11 in)
- Weight: 80 kg (176 lb; 12 st 8 lb)
- Division: Welterweight
- Style: Kickboxing
- Fighting out of: Wrocław, Poland
- Team: Wergi Gym
- Years active: 2007–present

Kickboxing record
- Total: 31
- Wins: 22
- By knockout: 6
- Losses: 8
- By knockout: 0
- Draws: 1
- No contests: 0

Other information
- Website: www.wergi.pl
- Last updated on: January 13, 2017

Paweł Jędrzejczyk (born 15 November 1980) is a Polish welterweight kickboxer and Muay Thai kickboxer. He is four time World Kickboxing Network Champion and one time World Kickboxing Association World Champion. He is first Polish fighter contracted by Glory.

== Personal life ==
Jędrzejczyk was born in Wrocław. He lived in Thailand with his parents as a child.

He is married to Natalia with one daughter and son.

== Muay Thai and kickboxing amateur career ==
Jędrzejczyk started training kickboxing and Muay Thai at age 19. He fought his first amateur fight at age 24. In 2004 he was picked by the Polish National Team, and started to fight internationally.

== Professional career ==
In 2009 he won his first WKN World Champion title (K-1 rules) in Nowa Sól Poland. After five rounds he won on points against Angelo Silva from Portugal. In 2010 he lost his title against Abder Khader Ahmed of Egypt. Wergi lost on points.

One year later he fought for another WKN World Title (79.400 kg) in Zielona Góra Poland at Makowski Fighting Championship event. Pawel won by KO in 4th round against Mukutadze Ednari.

On 3 December 2011 he won by KO against Hugo Miguel Rodríguez Méndez and won his first Muay Thai World Title at Nowa Sól, Poland during "MFC". event.

In 2009 he started to train and fight in Thailand. After few fights he got a shot to fight at legendary Rajadamnern Stadium at 16.09.2012 in Bangkok. He won in first round by KO against Thai Champion Cheerchai Petchpaothong and became first Polish Fighter who fought and won there.

In 2013 he fought at old Lumpinee Stadium in Bangkok and lost on points with Gareth Nellies of England. In the same year he became World Kickboxing Network World Champion one more time, winning on points against Dimitar Iliev.

After 15 months of break caused by injury he won his fifth World Title. This time he won by KO in fifth round via low kicks against Josip Balentovich. He became Thai Boxing WKA World Champion.

On 7 February 2015 he got the rematch with Gareth Nellies at New Lumpinee Boxing Stadium and won. On 24 May 2015 he won against F16 Rajanont in Pattaya at Max Muay Thai event. On 16 August 2016 he drew with Ekapop Sityodtong at another Max Muay Thai event.

In January 2016 Paweł Jędrzejczyk signed a contract with Glory. He lost on his debut to Richard Abraham at Glory 27 in Chicago. In 2017 he was scheduled to fight again for Glory in Chicago.

Paweł Jędrzejczyk is ranked on the first place in the "Polish male kickboxers rankings" at Madfight24.com.

== Achievements ==
- 2007
  - European Champion Muay Thai WMF
- 2009
  - World Champion K1 Rules WKN
- 2011
  - World Champion Muay Thai WKN
  - World Champion Oriental Rules WKN
- 2013
  - World Champion Kickboxing BB Rules WKN
- 2014
  - World Champion Thai Boxing WKA
- 2017
  - Makowski Fighting Championship Champion

== Professional kickboxing record ==
22 wins (6 (T)KOs), 8 losses, 1 draw
| Date | Result | Opponent | Event | Location | Method | Round | Time |
| 16.09.2017 | Win | Suriname Guilllermo Blokland | MFC | Zielona Góra, Poland | Decision | 5 (5) | 3:00 |
Wins Makowski Fighting Championship Champion title (-80 kg)
| 24.02.2017 | Loss | MEX Daniel Morales | Glory 38 | Chicago, United States | Decision | 3 | 3:00 |
| 03.12.2016 | Win | CZE Matouš Kohout | MFC11 | Nowa Sól, Poland | Decision | 3 | 3:00 |
| 24.09.2016 | Win | GRC Triantafyllos Alexandridis | MFC10 | Zielona Góra, Poland | Decision | 3 | 3:00 |
| 26.02.2016 | Loss | USA Richard Abraham | Glory 27 | Chicago, United States | Decision | 3 | 3:00 |
| 24.10.2015 | Loss | THA Thanelek | MAC1 | Wrocław, Poland | Decision | 5 | 3:00 |
| 12.09.2015 | Loss | NLD Eyevan Dannenberg | MFC8 | Zielona Góra, Poland | Decision | 3 | 3:00 |
| 16.08.2015 | Draw | THA Ekapop Sityodtong | Max Muay Thai Stadium Pattaya | Pattaya, Thailand | Decision | 3 | 3:00 |
| 24.05.2015 | Win | THA F-16 Rachanon | Max Muay Thai Stadium Pattaya | Pattaya, Thailand | Decision | 3 | 3:00 |
| 07.02.2015 | Win | ENG Gareth Nellies | Lumpinee Ramintra Stadium | Lumpinee Ramintra Stadium, Bangkok | Decision | 5 | 3:00 |
| 13.12.2014 | Win | ESP Daniel Menino Rosales | MFC7 | Nowa Sól, Poland | Decision | 3 | 3:00 |
Wins WKN International Poland Kickbxng Oriental Rules Title (-79.6 kg).
| 23.08.2014 | Win | HRV Josip Balentovich | Noc Góralskich Wojowników | Zakopane, Poland | TKO | 5 (5) | 2:00 |
| 24.05.2013 | Win | BGR Dimitar Iliev | Bigger's Better 22 | Zakopane, Poland | Decision | 5 | 2:00 |
Wins WKN World Kickboxing Title - BB Rules.
| 05.02.2013 | Loss | ENG Gareth Nellies | Lumpinee Boxing Stadium | Lumpinee Boxing Stadium, Bangkok | Decision | 5 | 3:00 |
| 08.12.2012 | Win | ENG Eddie Gill | MFC5 | Nowa Sól, Poland | Decision | 3 | 3:00 |
| 16.09.2012 | Win | THA Cheerchai Petchpaothong | Rajadamnern Stadium | Rajadamnern Stadium, Bangkok | KO | 1 (5) | 1:50 |
| 06.02.2012 | Loss | THA Petkarat | WMC Event | Petchbuncha Stadium, Thailand | Decision | 5 | 3:00 |
| 03.12.2011 | Win | PRT Hugo Miguel Rodrigues Mendes | MFC4 | Nowa Sól, Poland | KO | 1 (5) | 1:00 |
| 05.11.2011 | Win | ITA Michele Germele | IronFist 4 | Szczecin, Poland | KO | 3 (3) | 0:30 |
| 07.05.2011 | Win | GEO Mukutadze Ednari | MFC | Zielona Góra, Poland | KO | 4 (5) | 2:20 |
Wins WKN World Muay Thai Super Middleweight Title (-79.4 kg).
| 12.02.2011 | Win | THA Sapapet | Gala WMC | Thailand | KO | 1 (5) | 2:40 |
| 06.11.2010 | Win | ENG Jafar Mukri | Ironfist3 | Szczecin, Poland | Decision | 3 | 3:00 |
| 25.09.2010 | Loss | EGY Abdel Kader Ahmed | WKN Champ Class Fight Night2 | Nowa Sól, Poland | Decision | 5 | 3:00 |
Lost WKN World Oriental Rules Light Heavyweight Title (-82.1 kg).
| 17.04.2010 | Win | THA Sod Pornchaichumpon | Gala WMC | Thailand | Decision | 5 | 3:00 |
| 13.02.2010 | Win | THA Salatun | WMC Charity for Haiti | Thailand | Decision | 5 | 3:00 |
| 05.12.2009 | Win | PRT Angelo Silva | WKN Champ Class Fight Night | Nowa Sól, Poland | Decision | 5 | 3:00 |
Wins WKN World Oriental Rules Light Heavyweight Title (-82.1 kg).
| 26.09.2009 | Win | CZE Daniel Vitovec | Iron Fist | Szczecin, Poland | Decision | 5 | 3:00 |
| 12.06.2009 | Win | POL Wojciech Wilczkowiak | XFS 3 | Poznań, Poland | Decision | 3 | 3:00 |
| 31.01.2009 | Loss | THA Peley | Gala WMC Thai boxing | Thailand | Decision | 5 | 3:00 |
| 03.10.2008 | Win | TUR Ramazan Beyazkaya | WKN Event | Turkey | Decision | 3 | 3:00 |
| 06.01.2007 | Win | POL Wojciech Hoły | ISKA Night of Glory | Nowy Targ, Poland | Decision | 7 | 2:00 |
