= Hemagglutinin (influenza) =

Hemagglutinin of influenza virus

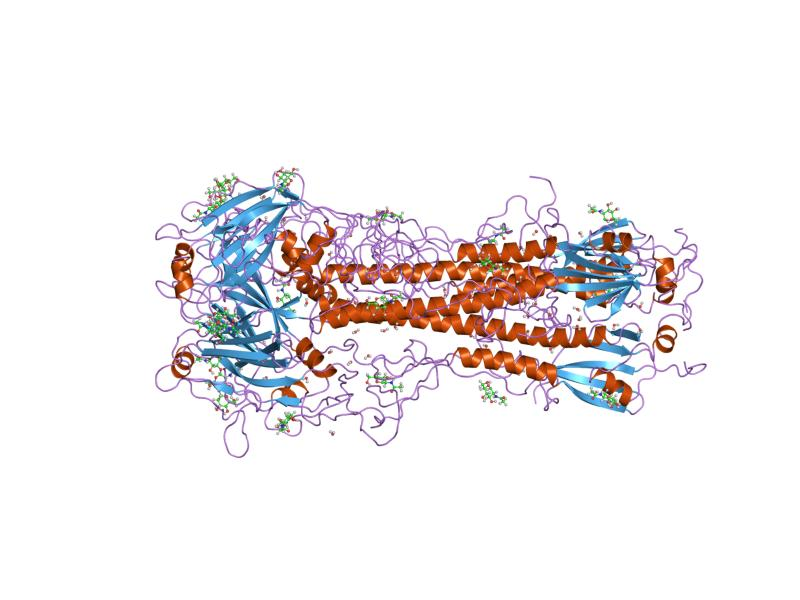

Identifiers
- Symbol: Hemagglutinin
- Pfam: PF00509
- InterPro: IPR001364
- SCOP2: 1hgd / SCOPe / SUPFAM
- OPM superfamily: 109
- OPM protein: 6hjq
Available protein structures:
- PDB: IPR001364 PF00509 (ECOD; PDBsum)
- AlphaFold: IPR001364; PF00509

Influenza C hemagglutinin stalk
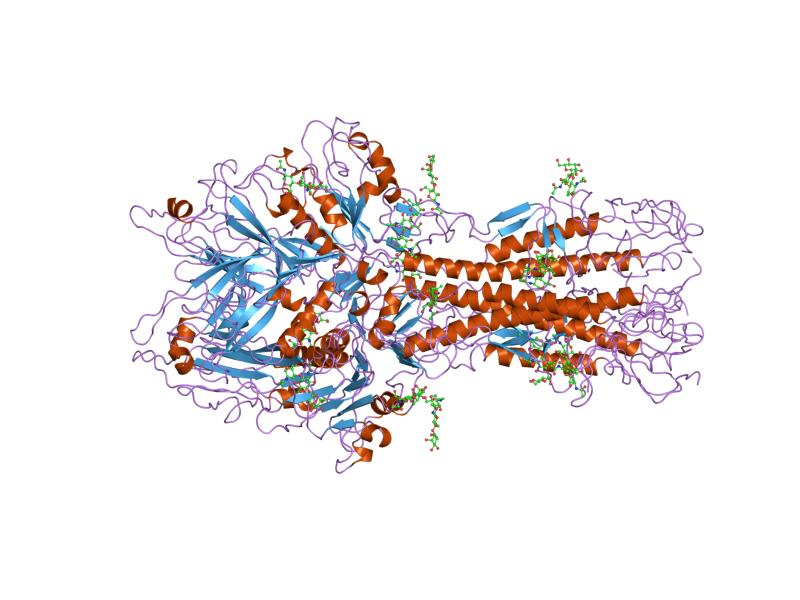
- x-ray structure of the haemagglutinin-esterase-fusion glycoprotein of influenza c virus

Identifiers
- Symbol: Hema_stalk
- Pfam: PF08720
- InterPro: IPR014831
- SCOP2: 1flc / SCOPe / SUPFAM
- OPM superfamily: 277
- OPM protein: 2jrd
Available protein structures:
- PDB: IPR014831 PF08720 (ECOD; PDBsum)
- AlphaFold: IPR014831; PF08720

Influenza hemagglutinin (HA) or haemagglutinin^{[p]} (British English) is a homotrimeric glycoprotein found on the surface of influenza viruses and is integral to its infectivity.

Hemagglutinin is a class I fusion protein, having multifunctional activity as both an attachment factor and membrane fusion protein. Therefore, HA is responsible for binding influenza viruses to sialic acid on the surface of target cells, such as cells in the upper respiratory tract or erythrocytes, resulting in the internalization of the virus. Additionally, HA is responsible for the fusion of the viral envelope with the late endosomal membrane once exposed to low pH (5.0–5.5).

The name "hemagglutinin" comes from the protein's ability to cause red blood cells (i.e., erythrocytes) to clump together (i.e., agglutinate) in vitro.

== Subtypes ==
Hemagglutinin (HA) in influenza A virus (IAV) has at least 18 different subtypes. These subtypes are named H1 through H18. H16 was discovered in 2004 on IAVs isolated from black-headed gulls from Sweden and Norway. H17 was discovered in 2012 in fruit bats. Most recently, H18 was discovered in a Peruvian bat in 2013. The first three hemagglutinins, H1, H2, and H3, are found in influenza viruses that infect humans. By phylogenetic similarity, the HA proteins are divided into two groups, with H1, H2, H5, H6, H8, H9, H11, H12, H13, H16, H17, and H18 belonging to group 1 and the rest in group 2. The serotype of IAV is determined by the HA and neuraminidase (NA) proteins expressed on its surface. Neuraminidase has 11 known subtypes; hence, influenza viruses are named according to the combinations of HA and NA proteins expressed (e.g., H1N1 and H5N2).

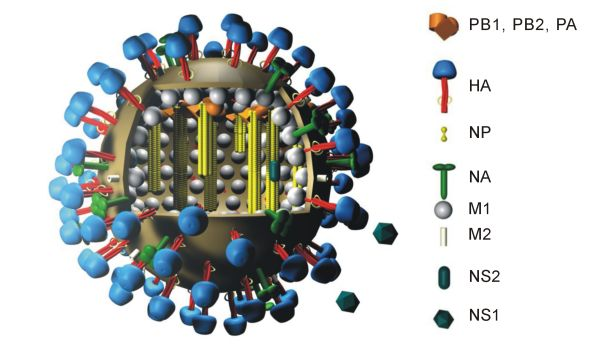
Structure of influenza, showing neuraminidase marked as NA and hemagglutinin as HA.

A highly pathogenic avian influenza A virus, A(H5N1), is known to infect humans as well as its original avian hosts, albeit quite infrequently. It has been reported that single amino acid changes in the virus's H5 hemagglutinin have been found in human patients that "can significantly alter receptor specificity of avian H5N1 viruses, providing them with an ability to bind to receptors optimal for human influenza viruses." This finding seems to explain how an H5N1 virus that normally does not infect humans can mutate and become able to efficiently infect human cells. The hemagglutinin of the H5N1 virus has been associated with its high degree of pathogenicity, apparently due to its ease of conversion to an active form by proteolysis.

== Structure ==
HA is a homotrimeric integral membrane glycoprotein. It has C3 molecular symmetry. It is shaped like a cylinder, and is approximately 13.5 nanometres long. HA trimer is made of three identical monomers. Each monomer is made of an intact HA0 single polypeptide chain with HA1 and HA2 regions that are linked by two disulfide bridges. Each HA2 region adopts alpha helical coiled coil structure and sits on top of the HA1 region, which is a small globular domain that consists of a mix of α/β structures. The HA trimer is synthesized as inactive precursor protein HA0 to prevent any premature and unwanted fusion activity and must be cleaved by host proteases in order to be infectious. At neutral pH, the 23 residues near the N-terminus of HA2, also known as the fusion peptide that is eventually responsible for fusion between viral and host membrane, is hidden in a hydrophobic pocket between the HA2 trimeric interface. The C-terminus of HA2, also known as the transmembrane domain, spans the viral membrane and anchors protein to the membrane.

HA1
HA1 is mostly composed of antiparallel beta-sheets.

HA2
HA2 domain contains three long alpha helices, one from each monomer. Each of these helices is connected by a flexible, loop region called Loop-B (residue 59 to 76).

== Function ==
HA plays two key functions in viral entry. Firstly, it allows the recognition of target vertebrate cells, accomplished through the binding to these cells' sialic acid-containing receptors. Secondly, once bound it facilitates the entry of the viral genome into the target cells by causing the fusion of host endosomal membrane with the viral membrane.

Specifically, the HA1 domain of the protein binds to the monosaccharide sialic acid which is present on the surface of its target cells, allowing attachment of viral particle to the host cell surface. HA17 and HA18 have been described to bind MHC class II molecules as a receptor for entry rather than sialic acid. The host cell membrane then engulfs the virus, a process known as endocytosis, and pinches off to form a new membrane-bound compartment within the cell called an endosome. The cell then attempts to begin digesting the contents of the endosome by acidifying its interior and transforming it into a lysosome. Once the pH within the endosome drops to about 5.0 to 6.0, a series of conformational rearrangement occurs to the protein. First, fusion peptide is released from the hydrophobic pocket and HA1 is dissociated from HA2 domain. HA2 domain then undergoes extensive conformation change that eventually bring the two membranes into close contact.

This so-called "fusion peptide" that was released as pH is lowered, acts like a molecular grappling hook by inserting itself into the endosomal membrane and locking on. Then, HA2 refolds into a new structure (which is more stable at the lower pH), it "retracts the grappling hook" and pulls the endosomal membrane right up next to the virus particle's own membrane, causing the two to fuse together. Once this has happened, the contents of the virus such as viral RNA are released in the host cell's cytoplasm and then transported to the host cell nucleus for replication.

== As a treatment target ==
Since hemagglutinin is the major surface protein of the influenza A virus and is essential to the entry process, it is the primary target of neutralizing antibodies. These antibodies against the influenza virus have been found to act by two different mechanisms, mirroring the dual functions of hemagglutinin:

=== Head antibodies ===
Some antibodies against hemagglutinin act by inhibiting attachment. This is because these antibodies bind near the top of the hemagglutinin "head" (blue region in figure above) and physically block the interaction with sialic acid receptors on target cells.

=== Stem antibodies ===
This group of antibodies acts by preventing membrane fusion (only in vitro; the efficacy of these antibodies in vivo is believed to be a result of antibody-dependent cell-mediated cytotoxicity and the complement system).

The stem or stalk region of HA (HA2), is highly conserved across different strains of influenza viruses. The conservation makes it an attractive target for broadly neutralizing antibodies that target all flu subtypes, and for developing universal vaccines that let humans produce these antibodies naturally. Its structural changes from prefusion to postfusion conformation drives fusion between viral membrane and host membrane. Therefore, antibodies targeting this region can block key structural changes that eventually drive the membrane fusion process, and therefore are able to achieve antiviral activity against several influenza virus subtypes. At least one fusion-inhibiting antibody was found to bind closer to the top of hemagglutinin, and is thought to work by cross-linking the heads together, the opening of which is thought to be the first step in the membrane fusion process.

Examples are human antibodies F10, FI6, CR6261. They recognize sites in the stem/stalk region (orange region in figure at right), far away from the receptor binding site.

In 2015 researchers designed an immunogen mimicking the HA stem, specifically the area where the antibody ties to the virus of the antibody CR9114. Rodent and nonhuman primate models given the immunogen produced antibodies that could bind with HAs in many influenza subtypes, including H5N1. When the HA head is present, the immune system does not generally make bNAbs (broadly neutralizing antibodies). Instead, it makes the head antibodies that only recognize a few subtypes. Since the head is responsible for holding the three HA units together, a stem-only HA needs its own way to hold itself together. One team designed self-assembling HA-stem nanoparticles, using a protein called ferritin to hold the HA together. Another replaced and added amino acids to stabilize a mini-HA lacking a proper head.

A 2016 vaccine trial in humans found many broadly neutralizing antibodies targeting the stem produced by the immune system. Three classes of highly similar antibodies were recovered from multiple human volunteers, suggesting that a universal vaccine that produces reproducible antibodies is indeed possible.

=== Other agents ===
There are also other hemagglutinin-targeted influenza virus inhibitors that are not antibodies:

1. Arbidol
2. Small Molecules
3. Natural compounds
4. Proteins and peptides

== See also ==
- FI6 antibody
- Phytohemagglutinin
- Hemagglutinin
- Neuraminidase
- Antigenic shift
- Sialic acid
- Epitope
- H5N1 genetic structure

== Notes ==
[p] Hemagglutinin is pronounced /he-mah-Glue-tin-in/.
