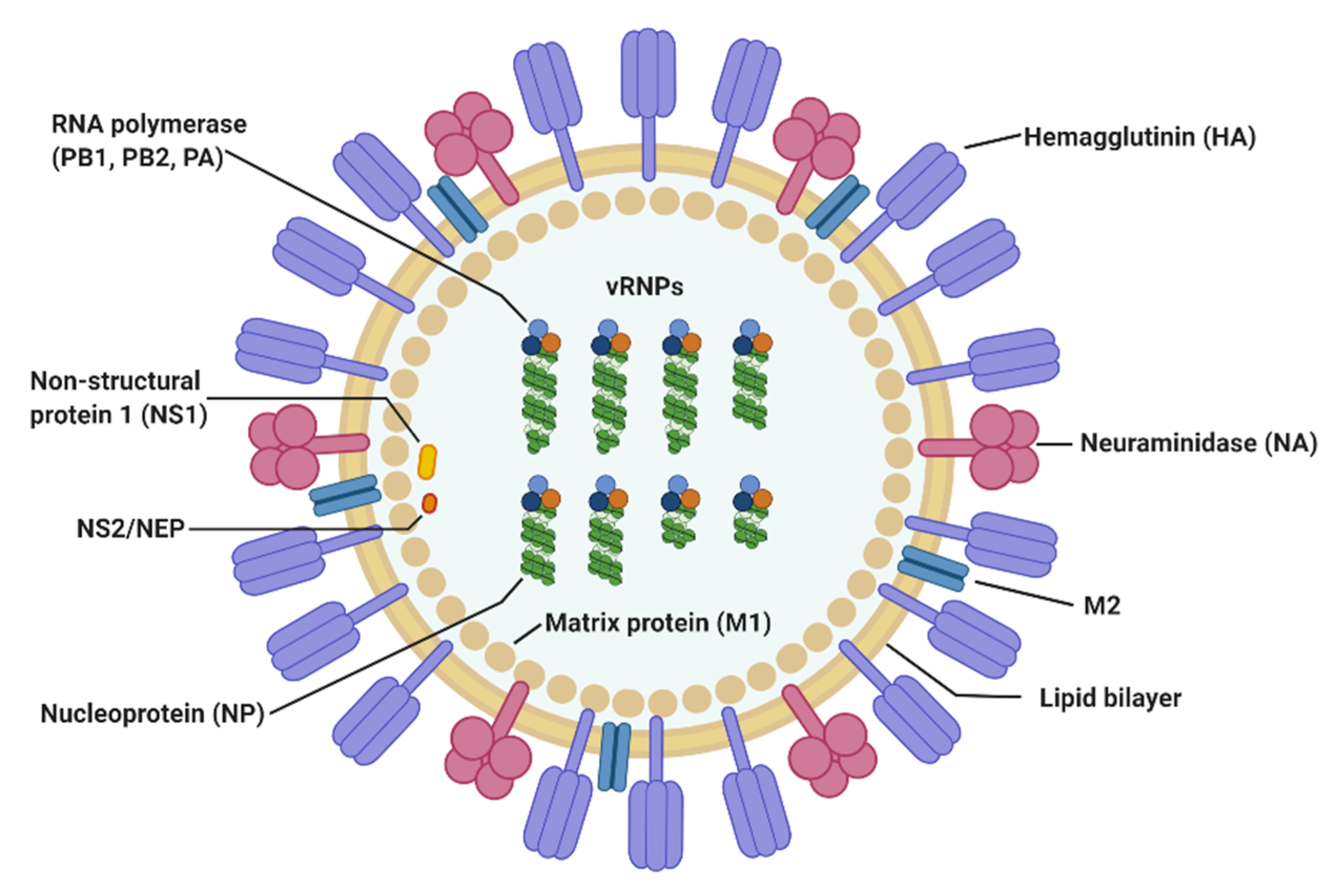
- Structure of influenza A virus
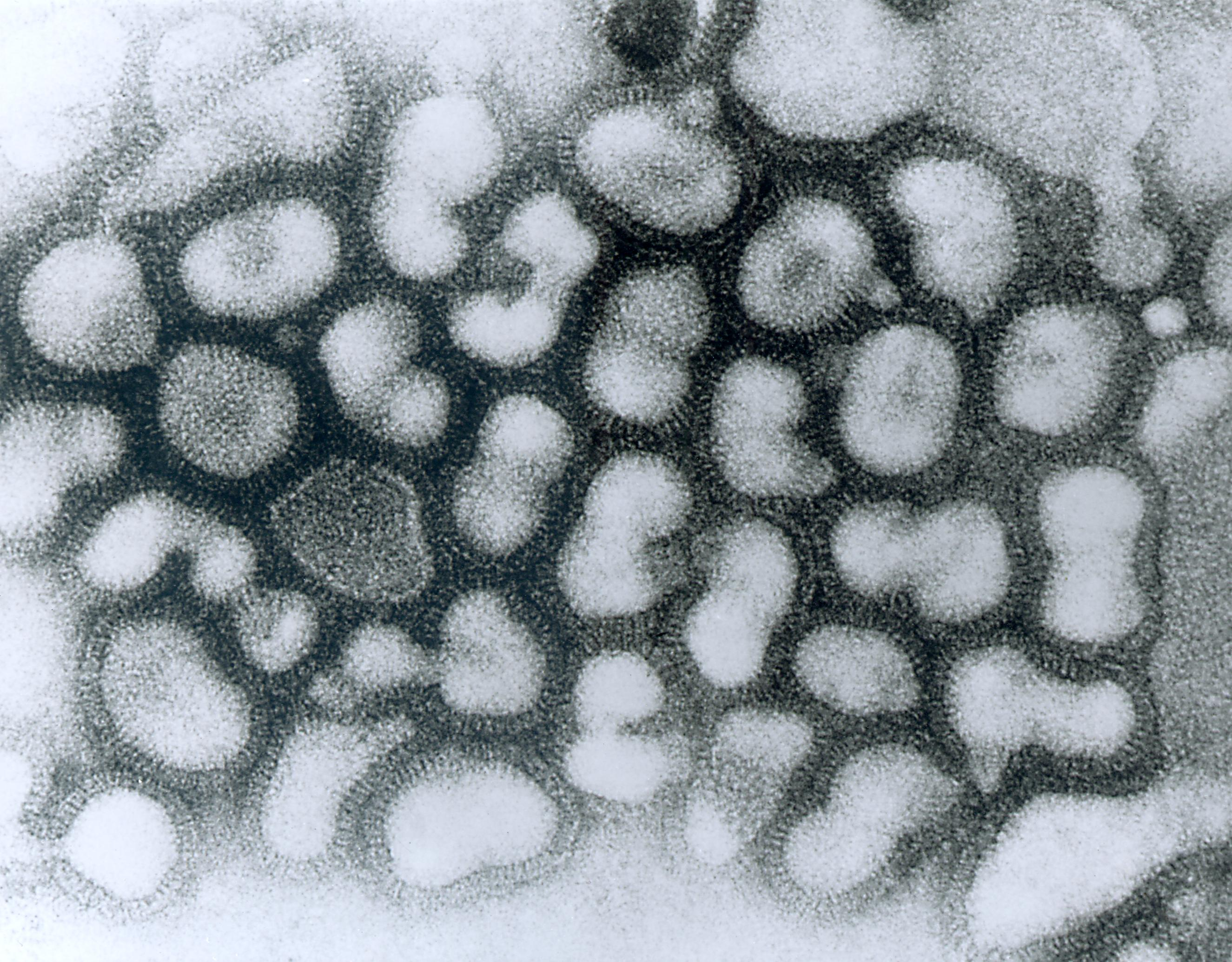
- TEM micrograph of influenza A viruses

Virus classification
- (unranked): Virus
- Realm: Riboviria
- Kingdom: Orthornavirae
- Phylum: Negarnaviricota
- Class: Insthoviricetes
- Order: Articulavirales
- Family: Orthomyxoviridae
- Genus: Alphainfluenzavirus
- Species: Alphainfluenzavirus influenzae

= Influenza A virus =

Alphainfluenzavirus influenzae

Species of virus

Influenza A virus, or IAV, is a pathogen with strains that cause seasonal flu in humans; it can also infect birds and some mammals. Strains of IAV circulate constantly in bats, pigs, horses, and dogs, while other mammals may be infected occasionally. It has also been the cause of a number of pandemics, most notably the Spanish Flu pandemic from 1918–1920.

Subtypes of IAV are defined by the combination of the molecules on the surface of the virus which provoke an immune response; for example, "H1N1" denotes a subtype that has a type-1 hemagglutinin (H) protein and a type-1 neuraminidase (N) protein. Variations within subtypes affect how easily the virus spreads, the severity of illness, and its ability to infect different hosts. The virus changes through mutation and genetic reassortment, allowing it to evade immunity and sometimes jump between species.

Symptoms of human seasonal flu usually include fever, cough, sore throat, muscle aches, headache and, in severe cases, breathing problems and pneumonia that may be fatal. Humans can rarely become infected with strains of avian or swine influenza, usually as a result of close contact with infected animals; symptoms range from mild to severe including death. Bird-adapted strains of the virus can be asymptomatic in some aquatic birds but lethal if they spread to other species, such as chickens.

IAV disease in poultry can be prevented by vaccination; however, biosecurity control measures such as quarantine, segregation, and good hygiene are preferred. In humans, seasonal influenza can be prevented by vaccination, or treated in its early stages with antiviral medicines. The Global Influenza Surveillance and Response System (GISRS) monitors the spread of influenza worldwide and informs development of both seasonal and pandemic vaccines. Several millions of specimens are tested by the GISRS network annually through a network of laboratories in 127 countries. As well as human viruses, GISRS monitors avian, swine, and other influenza viruses which could potentially infect humans. IAV vaccines need to be reformulated regularly in order to keep up with changes in the virus.

== Virology ==
=== Taxonomy ===
Influenza A virus, or IAV (scientific name Alphainfluenzavirus influenzae), is the only species of the genus Alphainfluenzavirus of the virus family Orthomyxoviridae.

=== Classification ===
There are two methods of classification, one based on the antigenic surface proteins, and the other based on its behavior, mainly the host animal.

==== Subtypes ====
Diagram of influenza nomenclature

There are two antigenic proteins on the surface of the viral envelope, hemagglutinin and neuraminidase. Based on their serotype, there are 18 known types of hemagglutinin and 11 types of neuraminidase. Subtypes of IAV are classified by their combination of H and N proteins. For example, "H5N1" designates an influenza A subtype that has a type-5 hemagglutinin (H) protein and a type-1 neuraminidase (N) protein.

By definition, the subtyping scheme only takes into account the two outer proteins, not the additional eight or more proteins which are coded by the genome. Almost all possible combinations of H (1 through 16) and N (1 through 11) have been isolated from wild birds. H17 and H18 have only been discovered in bats. Further variation exists within viral subtypes which may lead to significant differences in behavior.

==== Influenza virus nomenclature ====
Due to the high variability of the virus, subtyping is not sufficient to uniquely identify a strain of influenza A virus. To unambiguously describe a specific isolate of virus, researchers use the Influenza virus nomenclature, which describes, among other things, the subtype, year, and place of collection. Some examples include:

- A/Rio de Janeiro/62434/2021 (H3N2).
  - The starting A indicates that the virus is an influenza A virus.
  - Rio de Janeiro indicates the place of collection. 62434 is a laboratory sequence number. 2021 (or just 21) indicates that the sample was collected in 2021. No species is mentioned so by default, the sample was collected from a human.
  - (H3N2) indicates the subtype of the virus.
- A/swine/South Dakota/152B/2009 (H1N2).
  - This example shows an additional field before the place: swine. It indicates that the sample was collected from a pig.
- A/California/04/2009 A(H1N1)pdm09.
  - This example carries an unusual designation in the last part: instead of a usual (H1N1), it uses A(H1N1)pdm09. This was in order to distinguish the Pandemic H1N1/09 virus lineage from older H1N1 viruses.

=== Structure and genetics ===
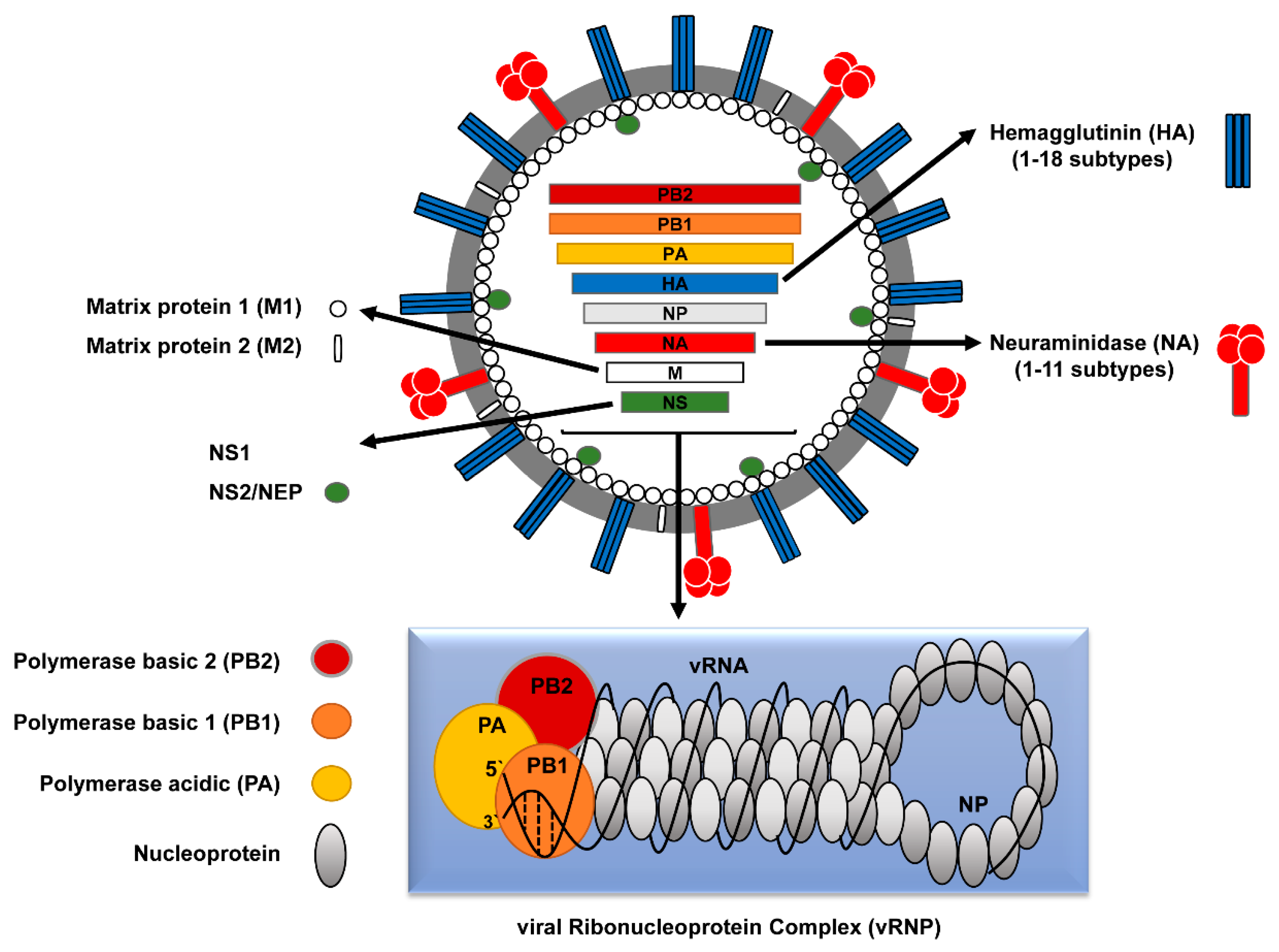
Influenza A virus structure

==== Structure ====
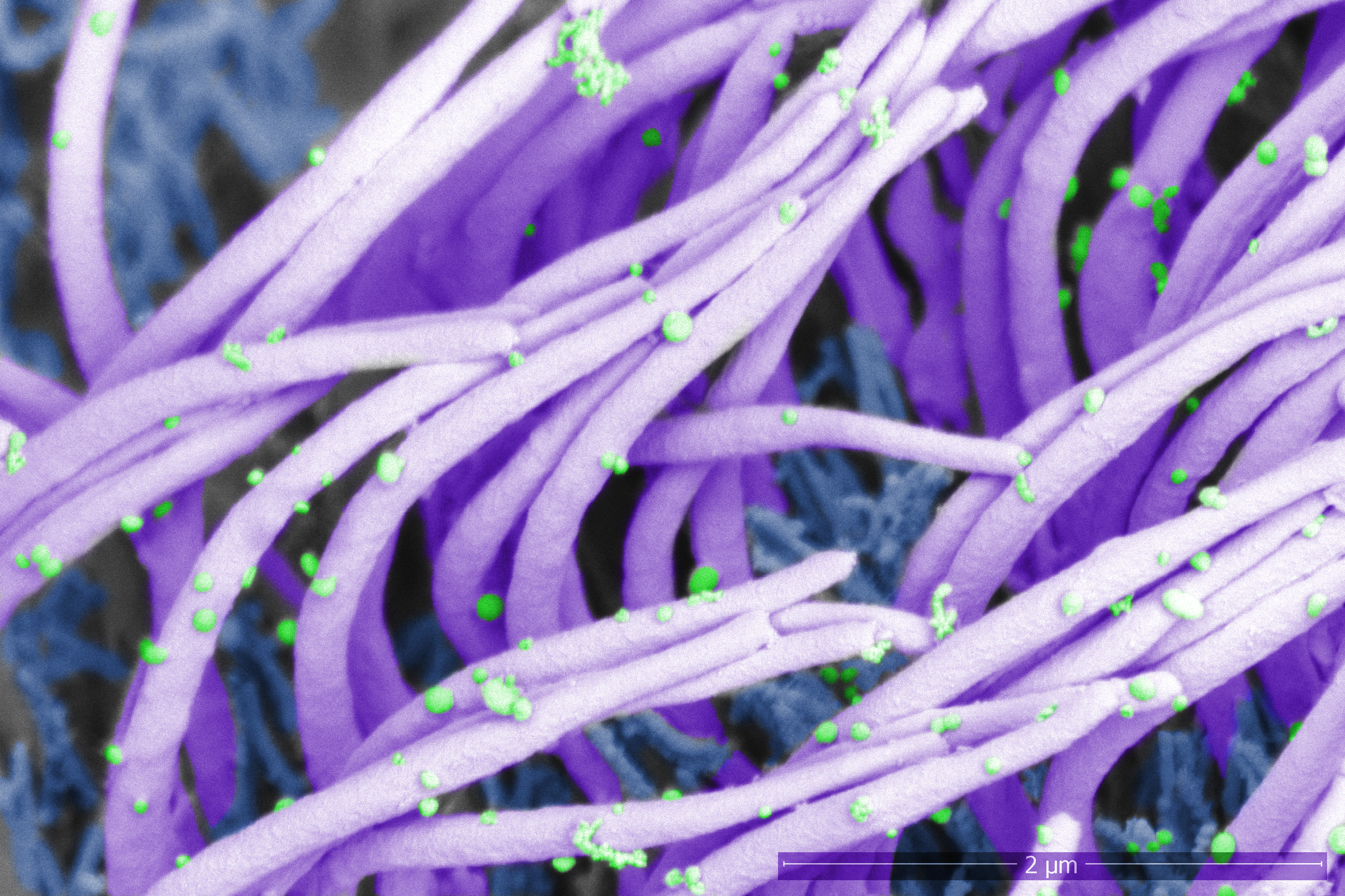
SEM image of influenza A virions infecting ciliated cells of human nasal epithelial organoid

The influenza A virus has a negative-sense, single-stranded, segmented RNA genome, enclosed in a lipid envelope. The virus particle (also called the "virion") is 80–120 nanometers in diameter, such that the smallest virions adopt an elliptical shape; larger virions have a filamentous shape.

Core – The central core of the virion contains the viral RNA genome, which is made of eight separate segments. The nucleoprotein (NP) coats the viral RNA to form a ribonucleoprotein that assumes a helical (spiral) configuration. Three large proteins (PB_{1}, PB_{2}, and PA), which are responsible for RNA transcription and replication, are bound to each segment of viral RNP.

Capsid – The matrix protein M1 forms a layer between the nucleoprotein and the envelope, called the capsid.

Envelope – The viral envelope consists of a lipid bilayer derived from the host cell. Two viral proteins; hemagglutinin (HA) and neuraminidase (NA), are inserted into the envelope and are exposed as spikes on the surface of the virion. Both proteins are antigenic; a host's immune system can react to them and produce antibodies in response. The M2 protein forms an ion channel in the envelope and is responsible for uncoating the virion once it has bound to a host cell.

==== Genome ====
The table below presents a concise summary of the influenza genome and the principal functions of the proteins which are encoded. Segments are conventionally numbered from 1 to 8 in descending order of length.

RNA segment	Length	Protein	Function
1- PB2	2341	PB2 (Polymerase Basic 2)	A component of the viral RNA polymerase. PB2 also inhibits JAK1/STAT signaling to inhibit host innate immune response
2- PB1	2341	PB1 (Polymerase Basic 1)	A component of the viral RNA polymerase. It also degrades the host cell's mitochondrial antiviral signaling protein
2- PB1	2341	PB1-F2 (Polymerase Basic 1-Frame 2)	An accessory protein of most IAVs. Not needed for virus replication and growth, it interferes with the host immune response.
3- PA	2233	PA (Polymerase Acid)	A component of the viral RNA polymerase
		PA-X	Arises from a ribosomal frameshift in the PA segment. Inhibits innate host immune responses, such as cytokine and interferon production.
4- HA	1775	HA (Hemagglutinin)	Part of the viral envelope, a protein that binds the virion to host cells, enabling the virus's RNA genetic material to invade it
5- NP	1565	NP (Nucleoprotein)	The nucleoprotein associates with the viral RNA to form a ribonucleoprotein (RNP). At the early stage of infection, the RNP binds to the host cell's importin-α which transports it into the host cell nucleus, where the viral RNA is transcribed and replicated. At a later stage of infection, newly manufactured viral RNA segments assemble with the NP protein and polymerase (PB1, PB2 and PA) to form the core of a progeny virion
6- NA	1409	NA (Neuraminidase)	Part of the viral envelope. NA enables the newly assembled virions to escape the host cell and go on to propagate the infection. NA also facilitates the movement of infective virus particles through mucus, enabling them to reach host epithelial cells.
7- M	1027	M1 (Matrix Protein 1)	Forms the capsid, which coats the viral nucleoproteins and supports the structure of the viral envelope. M1 also assists with the function of the NEP protein.
7- M	1027	M2 (Matrix Protein 2)	Forms a proton channel in the viral envelope, which is activated once a virion has bound to a host cell. This uncoats the virus, exposing its infective contents to the cytoplasm of the host cell
8- NS	890	NS1 (non-structural protein 1)	Counteracts the host's natural immune response and inhibits interferon production.
8- NS	890	NEP (Nuclear Export Protein, formerly NS2 non-structural protein 2)	Cooperates with the M1 protein to mediate the export of viral RNA copies from nucleus into cytoplasm in the late stage of viral replication

Three viral proteins - PB1, PB2, and PA – associate to form the RNA-dependent RNA polymerase (RdRp) which functions to transcribe and replicate the viral RNA.

Viral messenger RNA transcription – The RdRp complex transcribes viral mRNAs by using a mechanism called cap-snatching. It consists in the hijacking and cleavage of host capped pre-mRNAs. Host cell mRNA is cleaved near the cap to yield a primer for the transcription of positive-sense viral mRNA using the negative-sense viral RNA as a template. The host cell then transports the viral mRNA into the cytoplasm where ribosomes manufacture the viral proteins.

Replication of the viral RNA – The replication of the influenza virus, unlike most other RNA viruses, takes place in the nucleus and involves two steps. The RdRp first of all transcribes the negative-sense viral genome into a positive-sense complimentary RNA (cRNA), then the cRNAs are used as templates to transcribe new negative-sense vRNA copies. These are exported from the nucleus and assemble near the cell membrane to form the core of new virions.

== Epidemiology ==
=== Evolution and history ===
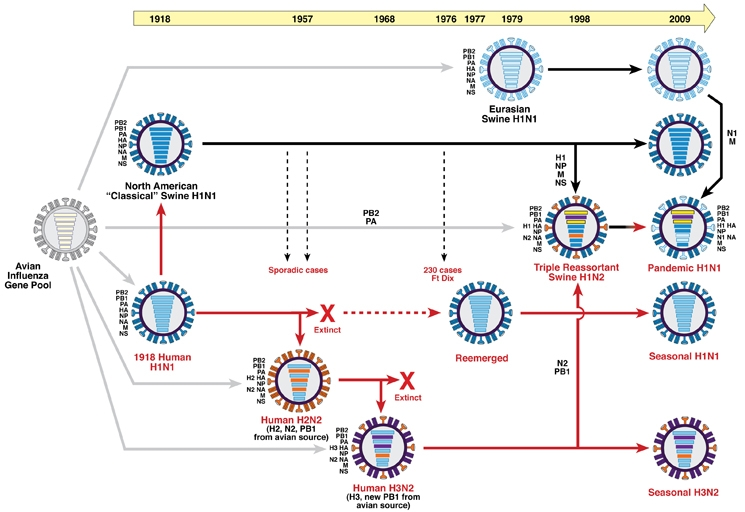
Genetic evolution of human and swine influenza viruses, 1918–2009

The predominant natural reservoir of influenza viruses is thought to be wild waterfowl. A 2023 study involving total RNA sequencing and transcriptome mining found that Influenzaviruses and the broader Articulavirales order likely had an aquatic origin, with fish being some of the earliest hosts, and the earliest viruses in the order evolving from Crustaceans over 600 million years ago. The subtypes of influenza A virus are estimated to have diverged 2,000 years ago. Influenza viruses A and B are estimated to have diverged from a single ancestor around 4,000 years ago, while the ancestor of influenza viruses A and B and the ancestor of influenza virus C are estimated to have diverged from a common ancestor around 8,000 years ago.

Outbreaks of influenza-like disease can be found throughout recorded history. The first probable record is by Hippocrates in 412 BCE. The historian Fujikawa listed 46 epidemics of flu-like illness in Japan between 862 and 1868. In Europe and the Americas, a number of epidemics were recorded through the Middle Ages and up to the end of the 19th century.

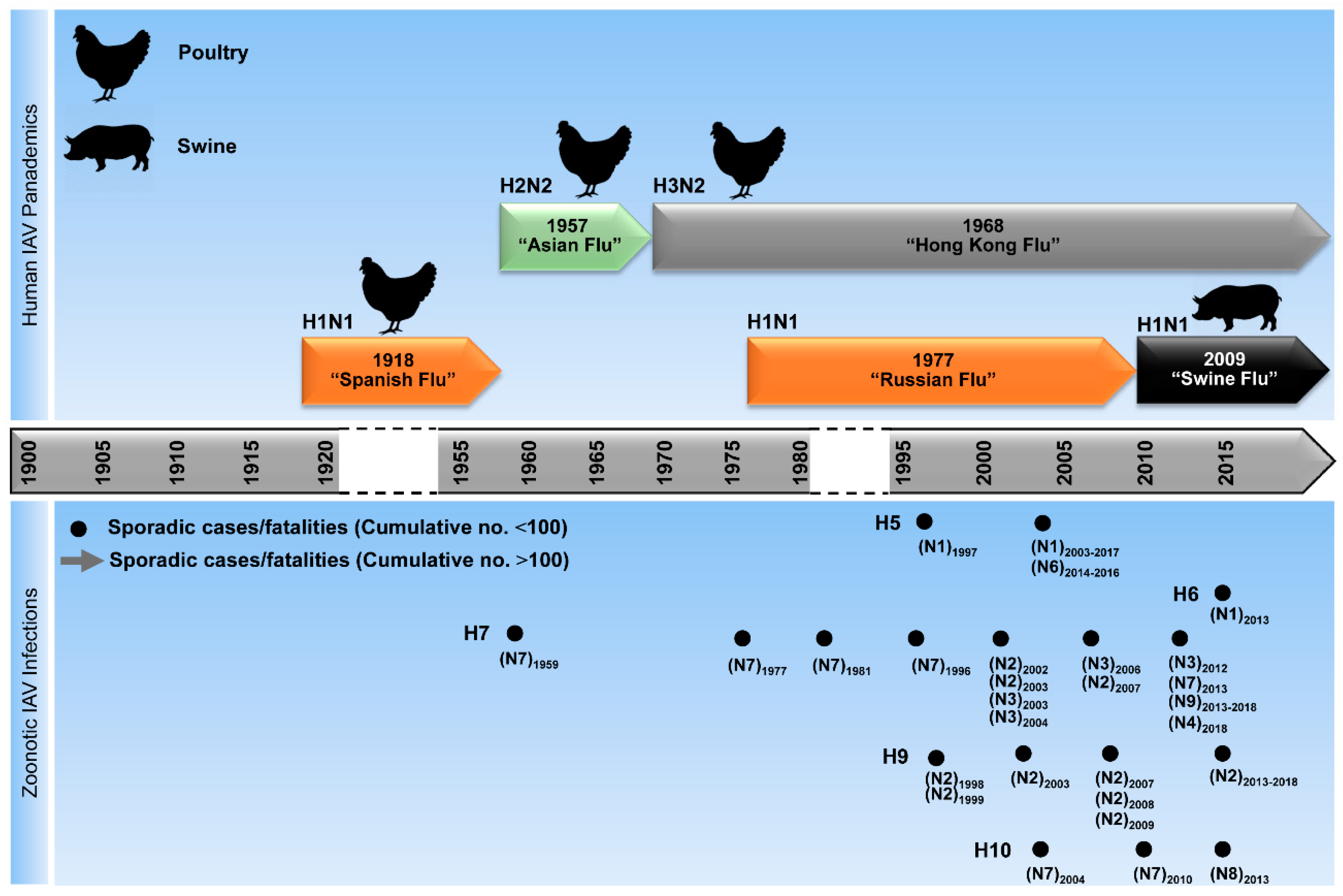
Timeline of flu pandemics and epidemics caused by influenza A virus

In 1918–1919 came the first flu pandemic of the 20th century, known generally as the "Spanish flu", which caused an estimated 20 to 50 million deaths worldwide. It is now known that this was caused by an immunologically novel H1N1 subtype of influenza A. The next pandemic took place in 1957, the "Asian flu", which was caused by a H2N2 subtype of the virus in which the genome segments coding for HA and NA appeared to have derived from avian influenza strains by reassortment, while the remainder of the genome was descended from the 1918 virus. The 1968 pandemic ("Hong Kong flu") was caused by a H3N2 subtype in which the NA segment was derived from the 1957 virus, while the HA segment had been reassorted from an avian strain of influenza.

In the 21st century, a strain of H1N1 flu (since titled "H1N1pdm09") was antigenically very different from previous H1N1 strains, leading to a pandemic in 2009. Because of its close resemblance to some strains circulating in pigs, this became known as "swine flu".

Influenza A virus continues to circulate and evolve in birds and pigs. Almost all possible combinations of H (1 through 16) and N (1 through 11) have been isolated from wild birds. As of June 2024, two particularly virulent IAV strains - H5N1 and H7N9 – are predominant in wild bird populations. These frequently cause outbreaks in domestic poultry, with occasional spillover infections in humans who are in close contact with poultry.

=== Pandemic potential ===
Influenza viruses have a relatively high mutation rate that is characteristic of RNA viruses. The segmentation of the influenza A virus genome facilitates genetic recombination by segment reassortment in hosts who become infected with two different strains of influenza viruses at the same time. With reassortment between strains, an avian strain which does not affect humans may acquire characteristics from a different strain which enable it to infect and pass between humans – a zoonotic event. It is thought that all influenza A viruses causing outbreaks or pandemics among humans since the 1900s originated from strains circulating in wild aquatic birds through reassortment with other influenza strains. It is possible (though not certain) that pigs may act as an intermediate host for reassortment.

=== Surveillance ===
The Global Influenza Surveillance and Response System (GISRS) is a global network of laboratories that monitor the spread of influenza with the aim to provide the World Health Organization with influenza control information and to inform vaccine development. Several millions of specimens are tested by the GISRS network annually through a network of laboratories in 127 countries. As well as human viruses, GISRS also monitors avian, swine, and other potentially zoonotic influenza viruses.

=== Seasonal flu ===
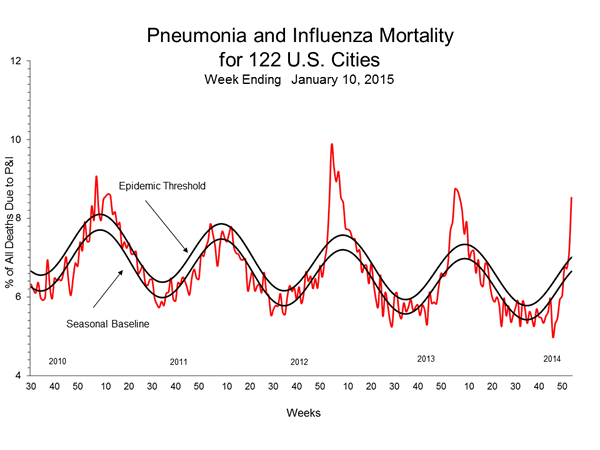
Seasonal variation in deaths due to influenza or pneumonia in 122 U.S. cities, as a proportion of all causes

Flu season is an annually recurring time period characterized by the prevalence of an outbreak of influenza, caused either by Influenza A or by Influenza B. The season occurs during the cold half of the year in temperate regions; November through February in the northern hemisphere and May to October in the southern hemisphere. Flu seasons also exist in the tropics and subtropics, with variability from region to region. Annually, about 3 to 5 million cases of severe illness and 290,000 to 650,000 deaths from seasonal flu occur worldwide.

There are several possible reasons for the winter peak in temperate regions:

- During the winter, people spend more time indoors with the windows sealed, so they are more likely to breathe the same air as someone who has the flu and thus contract the virus.
- Days are shorter during the winter, and lack of sunlight leads to low levels of vitamin D and melatonin, both of which require sunlight for their generation. This compromises our immune systems, which in turn decreases ability to fight the virus.
- The influenza virus may survive better in colder, drier climates, and therefore be able to infect more people.
- Cold air reduces the ability of the nasal membranes to resist infection.

Negative interference is known to occur between rhinovirus, the predominant cause of the common cold, and influenza. The 2009 Influenza Pandemic was interrupted in Europe by the annual autumn rhinovirus epidemic. Experiments in cell cultures show a rhinovirus infection can trigger an immune response which, when infected with influenza 3 days later, decreases the presence of influenza viral RNA 50,000-fold after 2 days compared to an unhindered influenza infection.

=== Zoonotic infections ===
A zoonosis is a disease in a human caused by a pathogen (such as a bacterium, or virus) that has jumped from a non-human to a human. Avian and pig influenza viruses can, on rare occasions, transmit to humans and cause zoonotic influenza virus infections; these infections are usually confined to people who have been in close contact with infected animals or material such as infected feces and meat, they do not spread to other humans. Symptoms of these infections in humans vary greatly; some are in asymptomatic or mild while others can cause severe disease, leading to severe pneumonia and death. A wide range of Influenza A virus subtypes have been found to cause zoonotic disease.

Zoonotic infections can be prevented by good hygiene, by preventing farmed animals from coming into contact with wild animals, and by using appropriate personal protective equipment.

As of June 2024, there is concern about two subtypes of avian influenza which are circulating in wild bird populations worldwide, H5N1 and H7N9. Both of these have potential to devastate poultry stocks, and both have jumped to humans with relatively high case fatality rates. H5N1 in particular has infected a wide range of mammals and may be adapting to mammalian hosts.

== Prevention and treatment ==
=== Vaccine ===
As of June 2024, the influenza viruses which circulate widely in humans are IAV subtypes H1N1 and H3N2, together with Influenza B. Annual vaccination is the primary and most effective way to prevent influenza and influenza-associated complications, especially for high-risk groups. Vaccines against the flu are trivalent or quadrivalent, providing protection against the dominant strains of IAV(H1N1) and IAV(H3N2), and one or two influenza B virus strains; the formulation is continually reviewed in order to match the predominant strains in circulation.

It is possible to vaccinate poultry and pigs against specific strains of influenza. Vaccination should be combined with other control measures such as infection monitoring, early detection and biosecurity.

=== Treatment ===
The main treatment for mild influenza is supportive; rest, fluids, and over-the-counter medicines to alleviate symptoms while the body's own immune system works to recover from infection. Antiviral drugs are recommended for those with severe symptoms, or for those who are at risk of developing complications such as pneumonia.

== Signs and symptoms ==
=== Humans ===
Symptoms of influenza, with fever and cough the most common symptoms

The symptoms of seasonal flu are similar to those of a cold, although usually more severe and less likely to include a runny nose. The onset of symptoms is sudden, and initial symptoms are predominately non-specific: a sudden fever; muscle aches; cough; fatigue; sore throat; headache; difficulty sleeping; loss of appetite; diarrhoea or abdominal pain; nausea and vomiting.

Humans can rarely become infected with strains of avian or swine influenza, usually as a result of close contact with infected animals or contaminated material; symptoms generally resemble seasonal flu but occasionally can be severe, including death.

=== Other animals ===
==== Birds ====
Some species of wild aquatic birds act as natural asymptomatic carriers of a large variety of influenza A viruses, which they can spread over large distances in their annual migration. Symptoms of avian influenza vary according to both the strain of virus underlying the infection, and on the species of bird affected. Symptoms of influenza in birds may include swollen head, watery eyes, unresponsiveness, lack of coordination, respiratory distress such as sneezing or gurgling.

===== Highly pathogenic avian influenza =====
Because of the impact of avian influenza on economically important chicken farms, avian virus strains are classified as either highly pathogenic (and therefore potentially requiring vigorous control measures) or low pathogenic. The test for this is based solely on the effect on chickens - a virus strain is highly pathogenic avian influenza if 75% or more of chickens die after being deliberately infected with it, or if it is genetically similar to such a strain. The alternative classification is low pathogenic avian influenza. Classification of a virus strain as either a low or high pathogenic strain is based on the severity of symptoms in domestic chickens and does not predict severity of symptoms in other species. Chickens infected with low pathogenic avian influenza display mild symptoms or are asymptomatic, whereas highly pathogenic avian influenza causes serious breathing difficulties, significant drop in egg production, and sudden death.

Since 2006, the World Organization for Animal Health requires all detections of low pathogenic avian influenza H5 and H7 subtypes to be reported because of their potential to mutate into highly pathogenic strains.

==== Pigs ====
Signs of swine flu in pigs can include fever, depression, coughing (barking), discharge from the nose or eyes, sneezing, breathing difficulties, eye redness or inflammation, and going off feed. Some pigs infected with influenza, however, may show no signs of illness at all. Swine flu subtypes are principally H1N1, H1N2, and H3N2; it is spread either through close contact between animals or by the movement of contaminated equipment between farms. Humans who are in close contact with pigs can sometimes become infected.

==== Horses ====
Equine influenza can affect horses, donkeys, and mules; it has a very high rate of transmission among horses, and a relatively short incubation time of one to three days. Clinical signs of equine influenza include fever, nasal discharge, have a dry, hacking cough, depression, loss of appetite and weakness. EI is caused by two subtypes of influenza A viruses: H7N7 and H3N8, which have evolved from avian influenza A viruses.

==== Dogs ====
Most animals infected with canine influenza A will show symptoms such as coughing, runny nose, fever, lethargy, eye discharge, and a reduced appetite lasting anywhere from 2–3 weeks. There are two different influenza A dog flu viruses: one is an H3N8 virus and the other is an H3N2 virus. The H3N8 strain has evolved from an equine influenza avian virus which has adapted to sustained transmission among dogs. The H3N2 strain is derived from an avian influenza which jumped to dogs in 2004 in either Korea or China. It is likely that the virus persists in both animal shelters and kennels, as well as in farms where dogs are raised for meat production.

==== Bats ====
The first bat flu virus, IAV(H17N10), was first discovered in 2009 in little yellow-shouldered bats (Sturnira lilium) in Guatemala. In 2012 a second bat influenza A virus IAV(H18N11) was discovered in flat-faced fruit-eating bats (Artibeus planirostris) from Peru. Bat influenza viruses have been found to be poorly adapted to non-bat species.

== Research ==
Influenza research includes efforts to understand how influenza viruses enter hosts, the relationship between influenza viruses and bacteria, how influenza symptoms progress, and why some influenza viruses are deadlier than others. Past pandemics, and especially the 1918 pandemic, are the subject of much research to understand and prevent flu pandemics.

The World Health Organization has published a Research Agenda with five streams:

- Stream 1. Reducing the risk of emergence of pandemic influenza. This stream is entirely focused on preventing and limiting pandemic influenza; this includes research into what characteristics make a strain either mild or deadly, worldwide surveillance of influenza A viruses with pandemic potential, and the prevention and management of potentially zoonotic influenza in domestic and farmed animals.
- Stream 2. Limiting the spread of pandemic, zoonotic and seasonal epidemic influenza. This is more broadly targeted at both pandemic and seasonal influenza, looking at the transmission of the virus between people and the ways in which it can spread globally, as well as the environmental and social factors which affect transmission.
- Stream 3. Minimizing the impact of pandemic, zoonotic, and seasonal epidemic influenza. This is principally concerned with vaccination – improving the effectiveness of vaccines, vaccine technology, as well as the speed with which an effective vaccine can be developed and ways in which vaccines can be manufactured and delivered worldwide.
- Stream 4. Optimizing the treatment of patients. This stream aims to reduce the impact of influenza by looking at methods of treatment, vulnerable groups, genetic predispositions, the interaction of influenza infection with other diseases, and influenza sequelae.
- Stream 5. Promoting the development and application of modern public health tools. Aiming to improve the ways in which public policy can combat influenza; this includes the introduction of new technologies, epidemic and pandemic modelling, and the communication of accurate and trustworthy information to the public.

== See also ==
- Influenza vaccine
- Veterinary virology
