= Vaccine ingredients =

Ingredients used in a vaccine dose

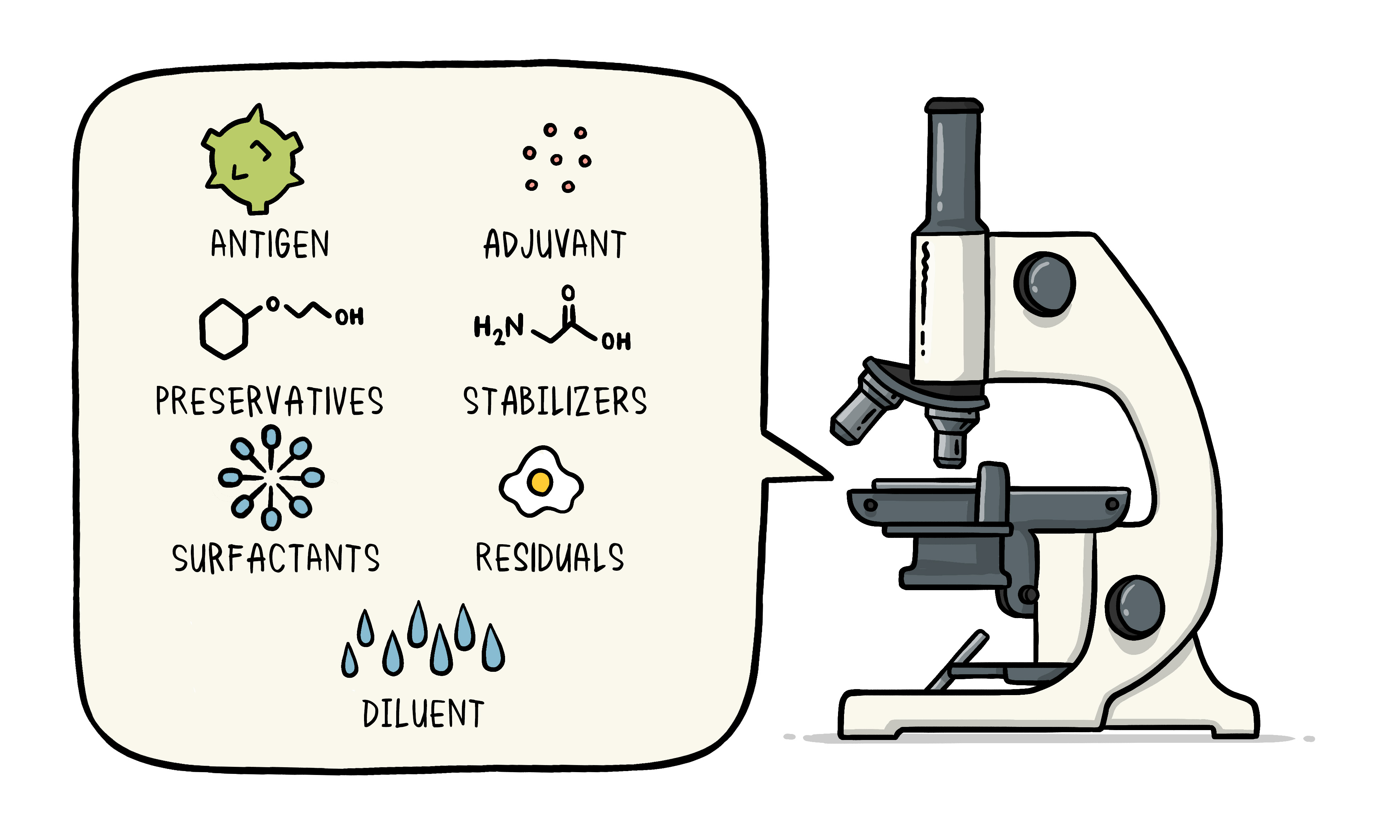
Graphic from the World Health Organization describing the main ingredients typically in vaccines

A vaccine dose contains many ingredients (such as stabilizers, adjuvants, residual inactivating ingredients, residual cell culture materials, residual antibiotics and preservatives) very little of which is the active ingredient, the immunogen. A single dose may have merely nanograms of virus particles, or micrograms of bacterial polysaccharides. A vaccine injection, oral drops or nasal spray is mostly water. Other ingredients are added to boost the immune response, to ensure safety or help with storage, and a tiny amount of material is left-over from the manufacturing process. Very rarely, these materials can cause an allergic reaction in people who are very sensitive to them.

== Volume ==
The volume of a vaccine dose is influenced by the route of administration. While some vaccines are given orally or nasally, most require an injection. Vaccines are not injected intravenously into the bloodstream. Most injections deposit a small dose into a muscle, but some are given superficially just under the skin surface or deeper beneath the skin.

Fluenz Tetra, a live flu vaccine for children, is administered nasally with 0.1ml of liquid sprayed into each nostril. The live typhoid vaccine, Vivotif, and a live adenovirus vaccine, licensed only for military use, both come as hard gastro-resistant tablets. The Sabin oral live polio vaccine is taken as two 0.05ml drops of a bitter salty liquid that was historically added to sugar cubes when given to young children. Rotarix, a live rotavirus vaccine, has about 1.5ml of liquid containing 1g of sugar to make it taste better. The Dukoral cholera vaccine comes as a 3ml suspension along with 5.6g of effervescent granules, which are mixed and added to around 150ml water to make a sweet raspberry flavoured drink.

At the other end of the volume scale, the smallpox vaccine is a minuscule 0.0025ml droplet that is picked up when a bifurcated needle is dipped into a vial containing around 100 doses. This needle is pricked 15 times into a small area of skin, just firmly enough to produce a drop of blood. A little larger is the BCG tuberculosis vaccine, which is 0.05ml for babies and children under 12, and 0.1ml for others. This tiny dose is inserted a couple of millimetres under the skin, producing a small blanched blister. Many vaccines for intramuscular injection have 0.5ml liquid, though a few have 1ml. (Note: The vaccines in the UK Immunisation Schedule: the 6-in-1 vaccine, Meningococcal Group B vaccine, Pneumococcal conjugate vaccine, Hib/MenC vaccine, MMR vaccine, Pre-school Booster, HPV vaccine, Teenage Booster, and MenACWY vaccine are all 0.5ml. The combined Hepatitis A and B vaccine, combined Hepatitis A and typhoid vaccine, and Rabies vaccine are all 1ml.)

Some vaccines come with the active ingredients already suspended in solution and the syringe pre-filled (e.g., Bexsero meningococcal Group B vaccine). Others are supplied as a vial of freeze-dried powder, which is reconstituted prior to administration using a dilutant from a separate vial or pre-filled syringe (e.g., MMR vaccine). Infanrix hexa, the 6-in-1 vaccine that protects against six diseases, uses a combination approach: the Hib vaccine in the powder and DTPa-HBV-IPV in suspension. Alternatively two separate vaccine solutions are mixed just before administration (ViATIM hepatitis A and typhoid vaccine).

== Immunogens ==
Many vaccines developed in the 20th century contain whole bacteria or viruses, which are either inactivated (killed), attenuated (weakened) or a strain chosen to be harmless in humans. Since these are so small, even a tiny amount of them contains a huge number of individuals.

With bacterial vaccines, we can enumerate this with an approximate number of bacteria cells. The live typhoid vaccine contains two billion viable cells of Salmonella enterica subsp. enterica serovar Typhi, which have been attenuated and cannot cause disease. The cholera vaccine has over thirty billion of each of four strains of Vibrio cholerae, which are inactivated by heat or formalin. The BCG vaccine, infant dose, contains between 100,000 and 400,000 colony-forming unit of live attenuated Mycobacterium bovis.

One way to count viruses is to observe their impact on host cells in tissue cultures. The two tablets of adenovirus vaccine, one with adenovirus type 4 and the other with type 7, each contain 32,000 tissue-culture infective doses (10^{4.5} TCID_{50}). The current live polio vaccine contains two serotypes of poliovirus: over 1 million tissue-culture infective doses (10^{6} TCID_{50}) of type 1 and over 630,000 (10^{5.8} TCID_{50}) of type 3. The smallpox vaccine contains between 250,000 and 1,250,000 plaque forming units of live vaccinia virus per dose. The MMR vaccine contains 1,000 TCID_{50} measles, 12,500 TCID_{50} mumps and 1,000 TCID_{50} rubella live attenuated viruses.

Many modern vaccines are made of only the parts of the pathogen necessary to invoke an immune response (a subunit vaccine) – for example just the surface proteins of the virus, or only the polysaccharide coating of a bacterium. Some vaccines invoke an immune response against the toxin produced by bacteria, rather than the bacteria itself. These toxoid vaccines are used against tetanus, diphtheria and pertussis (whooping cough). If the bacteria polysaccharide coating produces only a weak immune response on its own, it may be combined with (carried on) a protein that does provoke a strong response, which in turn improves the response to the weaker component. Such conjugate vaccines, may make use of a toxoid as the carrier protein. For all these, the quantity of immunogen is given by weight and sometimes expressed as international units (IU). The HVP vaccine contains 120 micrograms of the L1 capsid proteins from four types of human papillomavirus. The pneumococcal conjugate vaccine contains 32 micrograms of pneumococcal polysaccharide conjugated with CRM_{197} (a diphtheria toxin).

Another variant is the RNA vaccine, which contains mRNA embedded in lipid (fat) nanoparticles. The mRNA instructs body's own cell machinery to produce the proteins that stimulate the immune response. Comirnaty, the Pfizer-BioNTech COVID-19 vaccine contains thirty micrograms of BNT162b2 RNA.

== Excipients ==
Excipients are substances present in the vaccine that are not the principal immunological agents. These may be present to enhance the vaccine's potency, ensure safety, aid with storage or are left over from the manufacturing process.

=== Adjuvants ===
Live vaccines produce a strong immune response that lasts a long time, but they are not suitable for people with weakened immune systems. Other kinds of vaccine, where the pathogen has been inactivated or that contain only part of the pathogen, often alone produce a weaker response and require booster doses. In these vaccines, a substance called an adjuvant is added to make the immune response stronger and longer lasting.

The most commonly used adjuvants are aluminium salts such as aluminium hydroxide, aluminium phosphate or potassium aluminium sulphate (also simply called alum). These aluminium salts can be responsible for soreness and redness at the vaccination site but do not cause any long-term harm to human health. The amount of aluminium in these vaccines ranges from 0.125 milligrams in the pneumococcal conjugate vaccine to 0.82 milligrams in the 6-in-1 vaccine. The Meningococcal Group B vaccine contains 0.5 milligrams and in the UK Immunisation Schedule is given at the same time as the 6-in-1 vaccine at eight and sixteen weeks, giving a combined dose of 1.32 milligrams of aluminium. Aluminium salts are commonly and naturally consumed in small quantities, and the quantity in this combined vaccine dose is lower than the weekly safe intake level. Vaccines containing aluminium adjuvants cannot be frozen or allowed to freeze accidentally in a refrigerator, as this causes the particles to coagulate and damages the antigen.

Another adjuvant used in some flu vaccines is an oil-in-water emulsion. The oil, squalene, is found in all plant and animal cells, and is commercially extracted and purified from shark liver. The flu vaccine for older adults, Fluad, uses an adjuvant branded MF59, which has squalene (9.75 milligrams), citric acid (0.04 milligrams) and three emulsifiers: polysorbate 80, sorbitan trioleate, sodium citrate (1.175, 1.175 and 0.66 milligrams respectively). The H1N1 swine-flu vaccine, Pandemrix, used the adjuvant branded AS03, which has squalene (10.69 milligrams), DL-α-tocopherol (11.86 milligrams) and polysorbate 80 (4.86 milligrams)

=== Preservatives ===
Preservatives prevent the growth of bacteria and fungi, and are more commonly used in vaccines produced as multi-dose vials. They must also be non-toxic in the dose used and not adversely affect the immunogenicity of the vaccine. Thiomersal is the best known and most controversial preservative. It was phased out of UK vaccines between 2003 and 2005 and is not used in any routine vaccines in the UK. As a precaution, the US and Europe have also removed thiomersal from vaccines, despite there being no evidence of harm. The US-licensed vaccines in the routine paediatric schedule generally have no thiomersal at all; a few have only a trace amount as a residual from manufacturing (less than one microgram). This is also the case for influenza vaccines in the US that come in single-dose vials or prefilled syringes. Some influenza vaccines are also available as a multi-dose vial, and in that form contain thiomersal (24.5 micrograms of mercury).

Phenol 0.25% v/v is used in Pneumovax 23, a pneumococcal polysaccharide vaccine, and in the smallpox vaccine. However, phenol reduces the potency of diphtheria and tetanus toxoid-containing vaccines. Similarly, thiomersal weakens the immunogenicity of the inactivated poliovirus vaccine, so the IPOL vaccine contains 2–3 microlitres of 2-phenoxyethanol instead.

=== Stabilisers ===
Stabilisers protect the vaccine from the effects of temperature and ensure it does not degrade in storage. For vaccines that are freeze-dried, they provide a necessary bulk. Without them, the vaccine powder would be invisibly tiny (ranging from nanograms to a few tens of micrograms) and stick to the vial glass. Stabilisers used for vaccines include sugars (sucrose, lactose), sorbitol, amino acids (glycine, monosodium glutamate) and proteins (hydrolysed gelatin). There have very rarely (one in two million vaccinations) been cases of allergic reaction to the proteins in gelatin. The source of gelatin, pork, is of religious concern to Jewish and Muslim communities, though some leaders have ruled this is not a cause to reject vaccines that are injected or inhaled rather than ingested. There are alternatives for some vaccines that contain gelatine.

Acidity regulators such as phosphate salts keep the pH within a required range during manufacture and in the final product. Other salts help ensure the vaccine is isotonic with body fluids.

=== Manufacturing residuals ===
There are materials that serve no function in the final vaccine but are left over from the manufacturing process. Bacteria and viruses may be inactivated using formaldehyde. The quantity remaining in diphtheria or tetanus toxoid vaccines licensed in the US is required to be less than 0.1 milligrams (0.02%). Although formaldehyde has potentially toxic and carcinogenic properties in large doses, it is present in the blood (due to natural biochemical processes) at much higher concentrations than permitted in vaccines. Alternatives used in some vaccines include glutaraldehyde and β-propiolactone. Antibiotics may be used to prevent bacteria growing during vaccine manufacture and traces of these may remain. Antibiotics that some people are allergic to (such as cephalosporins, penicillins and sulphonamides) are not used. Those that are used include kanamycin, gentamicin, neomycin, polymyxin B, and streptomycin.

A small amounts of protein may remain from the material used to grow viruses, to which some people may be hypersensitive. Some influenza and yellow fever vaccines are grown in chicken eggs, and measles or mumps vaccines may be grown in chick embryo cell culture. Engerix-B, a recombinant DNA vaccine for hepatitis B is produced in yeast and may contain up to five percent yeast protein. Cervarix, an HPV vaccine, is grown in a cell line from the cabbage looper moth. The amount of insect protein remaining is less than forty nanograms.

Some components of the vaccine vial or syringe may contain latex rubber. This is a problem for those with a severe allergic reaction to latex, but not for those who get contact dermatitis after wearing latex gloves.
