= Vi capsular polysaccharide vaccine =

Vaccine for the prevention of typhoid

Vaccine description
- Target: Typhoid
- Vaccine type: Polysaccharide

Clinical data
- Trade names: Typherix, Typhim VI
- AHFS/Drugs.com: Multum Consumer Information
- Routes of administration: intramuscular injection, subcutaneous injection
- ATC code: J07AP03 (WHO)

Legal status
- Legal status: US: ℞-only

Identifiers
- CAS Number: 1704529-13-4
- ChemSpider: none
- KEGG: D12923

The Vi capsular polysaccharide vaccine (or ViCPS) is a typhoid vaccine recommended by the World Health Organization for the prevention of typhoid (another is Ty21a). The vaccine was first licensed in the US in 1994 and is made from the purified Vi capsular polysaccharide from the Ty2 Salmonella Typhi strain; it is a subunit vaccine.

== Medical uses ==
The vaccine may be used in endemic areas in order to prevent typhoid. It is also commonly used to protect people who are traveling to parts of the world where typhoid is endemic.

== Dosing ==
The vaccine is injected either under the skin or into a muscle at least seven days before traveling to the typhoid-affected area (the CDC recommend 14 days). The vaccine is not effective in children under the age of two. To maintain immunity, the vaccine should be repeated every three years.

== Efficacy and duration of protection ==
The vaccine offers effective protection the first year after being given (with between 50% and 80% efficacy), second year (31% to 76%), and third year cumulative efficacy of around 55%.

== Biology ==
The Vi polysaccharide, or Vi antigen, is part of the bacterial capsule found outside of the typhoid bacterium, Salmonella enterica subsp. enterica ser. Typhi. It is produced by the action of a single gene cluster in the cytoplasm and transported to the surface. This antigen contributes to much of typhoid's virulence, and is important for the infection of intestinal epithelial cells. It is also produced by S. enterica ser. Paratyphi C, the causative agent of paratyphoid fever C.

== Trade names ==
- Typhim VI (manufactured by Sanofi Pasteur)
- Typherix (manufactured by GlaxoSmithKline)

== Research ==
A newer conjugate form of the vaccine (Vi bound to a non-toxic recombinant Pseudomonas aeruginosa exotoxin A, or Vi-rEPA) has enhanced efficacy, including protection of children under 5 years of age.

The typhoid conjugate vaccine ("Typbar-TCV") is another Vi-based conjugate vaccine, in this case linked to Tetanus toxoid. It has been approved.

== See also ==
- Typhoid vaccine
