= Nanshitou massacre =

Massive deaths in China in 1942–1945

- Part of the Second Sino-Japanese War and the Pacific Theater of World War II
- Location: Nanshitou Refugee Camp in Guangzhou, China
- Date: 1942-1945
- Target: Chinese civilians
- Attack type: Massacre, human experimentation, poisoning
- Deaths: 100,000 (lowest estimate)
- Perpetrator: Unit 8604 of the Imperial Japanese Army

The Nanshitou massacre (simplified Chinese: 南石头大屠杀; traditional Chinese: 南石頭大屠殺) was large-scale unnatural deaths among the refugees detained by the Imperial Japanese Army and Wang Jingwei regime at the Nanshitou Refugee Camp in Guangzhou, China, between 1942 and 1945. The event was triggered by the Japanese expulsion of Chinese residents from Japanese-occupied Hong Kong in 1942, which resulted in refugees crowding into the city of Guangzhou by ferry along the Pearl River. They were stopped at Nanshitou for physical examinations. A former soldier of Unit 8604 stated that the unit was instructed to poison Chinese refugees with the pathogens of typhoid and paratyphoid, which they put into the thin porridge and drinking water prepared for the refugees, causing a large number of deaths. Additionally, survivors claimed that the Japanese used detainees for human experimentation. In the 1950s and 1980s, Guangzhou Paper Mill found a massive amount of human skeletons and bones during construction projects, which were believed to be victims of the refugee camp. Chinese scholar Tan Yuanheng asserts that at least 100,000 died in the refugee camp.

== Background ==
=== Expelling of Chinese from Hong Kong ===
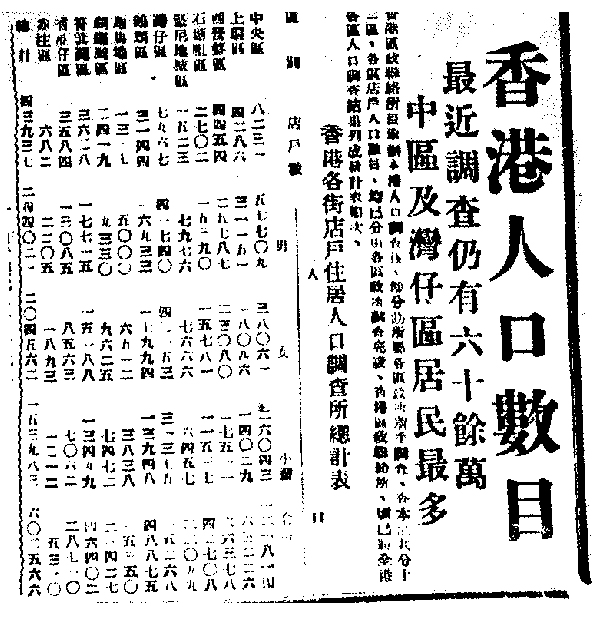
Decline of Hong Kong population

In October 1938, following the Japanese occupation of Guangzhou, 100,000 to 200,000 Guangzhou residents fled Hong Kong due to the historical ties between the two cities. The Japanese took British Hong Kong in December 1941, following its attack on the Pearl Harbor. The Japanese military authorities considered the massive Chinese population in Hong Kong could be a burden to the city and soon began expelling Chinese from the city.

By 19 February 1942, 554,000 individuals had been repatriated. Subsequently, a governor's office was established in Hong Kong, overseeing the expulsion of another 419,000 people by the end of September 1943. It is estimated that a significant portion of refugees returning to Guangzhou by sea numbered at least 150,000 or more. In April 1944, the Hong Kong Occupied Territories Government halted rice distribution to the general population. The surge in repatriates prompted the cessation of encouraged evacuation in July. By the time of Japan's surrender, Hong Kong's population had dwindled to 600,000.

=== Nanshitou refugee camp ===
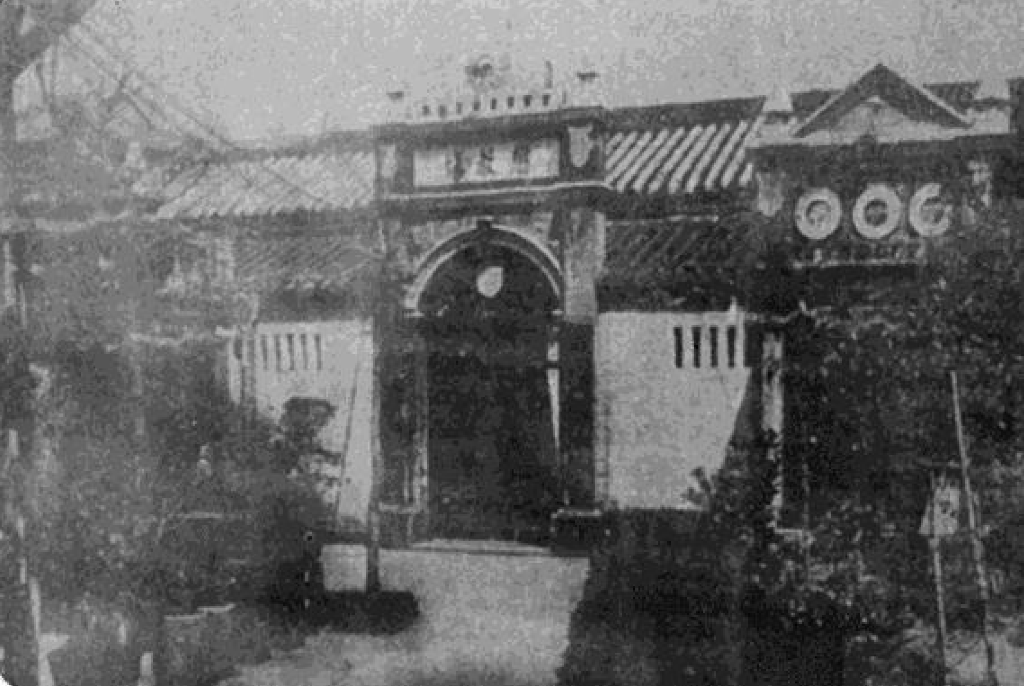
Nanshitou camp

The refugee camp at Nanshitou was a prison in the south suburb of Guangzhou, which had a dock upon the Pearl River. It was turned into a refugee camp, with the surge of refugees arriving from Hong Kong until the Japanese surrender in 1945. As the number of refugees was far above the capacity of the camp, ferries carrying refugees were anchored on the Pearl River near Nanshitou. The refugees were prohibited from leaving Nanshitou and forced them to work for the Japanese or Wang Jingwei authorities.

=== Unit 8604 ===
By the end of 1939, the Imperial Japanese Army in Guangzhou had organised Unit 8604, purportedly tasked with providing epidemic prevention water supply for the Japanese army. However, its actual activities involved bacteriological research and bacteriological warfare. While the refugee camp was run by the Guangdong Provincial Government under the Wang Jingwei regime, Unit 8604 took control of the epidemic prevention in the camp, where the unit secretly murdered refugees with bacteriological weapons and experimentations.

== Refugee camp ==
=== Quarantine processes ===
According to eyewitness accounts, the quarantine process roughly proceeded as follows: Upon anchoring the ships, quarantine procedures were conducted, whereby individuals suspected of being infected were isolated and taken away, while the rest were driven back onto the ships. Quarantine inspections sometimes took place on board, at other times at the Yuehai Customs Harbor Quarantine Office, and occasionally on the riverbanks or flat ground ashore. The so-called quarantine procedure involved "men, women, old, and young being forced to strip naked, exposing their buttocks upwards," followed by rectal examinations using glass rods. However, in Japanese military records, there is no detailed documentation regarding the specific quarantine procedures for refugees in the so-called "refugee camps on board ships." Furthermore, if thermometers were used, this step alone would not accurately detect infectious diseases. If sampling probes were used, questions arose regarding whether there were registration numbers, and how large quantities of samples were stored and tested, among other issues. It is unlikely that standard quarantine procedures would lead to the destruction of relevant documentation. Due to the limited capacity of the Nanshitou Refugee Camp, which could accommodate only about 5,000 people at most, many refugees were initially placed on refugee ships awaiting processing. Once the camp reached full capacity, refugees were transferred to the camp, and this cycle repeated as needed.

=== High death toll ===
Survivors typically described that there was a significant decrease in the number of people aboard the ships. Some refugees couldn't endure the waiting period and died on the ships, mostly due to starvation or disease, with some potentially being caused by the spread of pathogens. While fleas were typically absent on board, some refugees recalled sudden infestations of fleas, followed by a succession of deaths, with "people dying every day," and the deceased being thrown into the river. Refugees believed this was the result of the deliberate dissemination of fleas carrying pathogens by the Japanese. Others attempted to escape secretly.

After the establishment of the Guangdong Provincial Infectious Diseases Hospital by the Japanese following the Customs Quarantine Station at Nanshitou, it was purported to be for the centralized treatment of cholera among Cantonese-Hong Kong refugees, with the cholera outbreak in Guangzhou attributed to the refugees. Locals referred to this hospital as the "Japanese Hospital." According to records from the Japanese hospital, Hong Kong refugees were generally in a state of starvation, with 90.1% suffering from malnutrition, which was the leading cause of death. Among those afflicted with cholera, the highest mortality rates were observed in individuals aged 1 to 10 and 61 to 70, reaching 60-70%. After the age of 40, mortality rates increased significantly. Mortality rates for other age groups ranged from 40 to 70%. Deaths were concentrated in July, during the warmer months, and mortality rates sometimes reached 90% between July and September. Therefore, research suggests that the mortality of cholera is most strongly correlated with temperature rather than gender. When patients experienced severe diarrhoea, mortality rates could reach 40%; with vomiting, mortality rates rose to 57.1%. The mortality rate for patients who vomited five times a day reached 24.7%. Additionally, 52.2% of patients experienced spasms: 31.8% in the upper limbs, 47.8% in the lower limbs, and 20.4% in both upper and lower limbs.

=== Human experimentation ===
Trapped bird, dreams of skies so vast,

Struggles to soar, held fast,

Rejects bland gruel, hunger gnaws within,

Pains in belly, no remedy to win,

Inevitably to perish, in bone's abyss.

— A popular verse among detainees

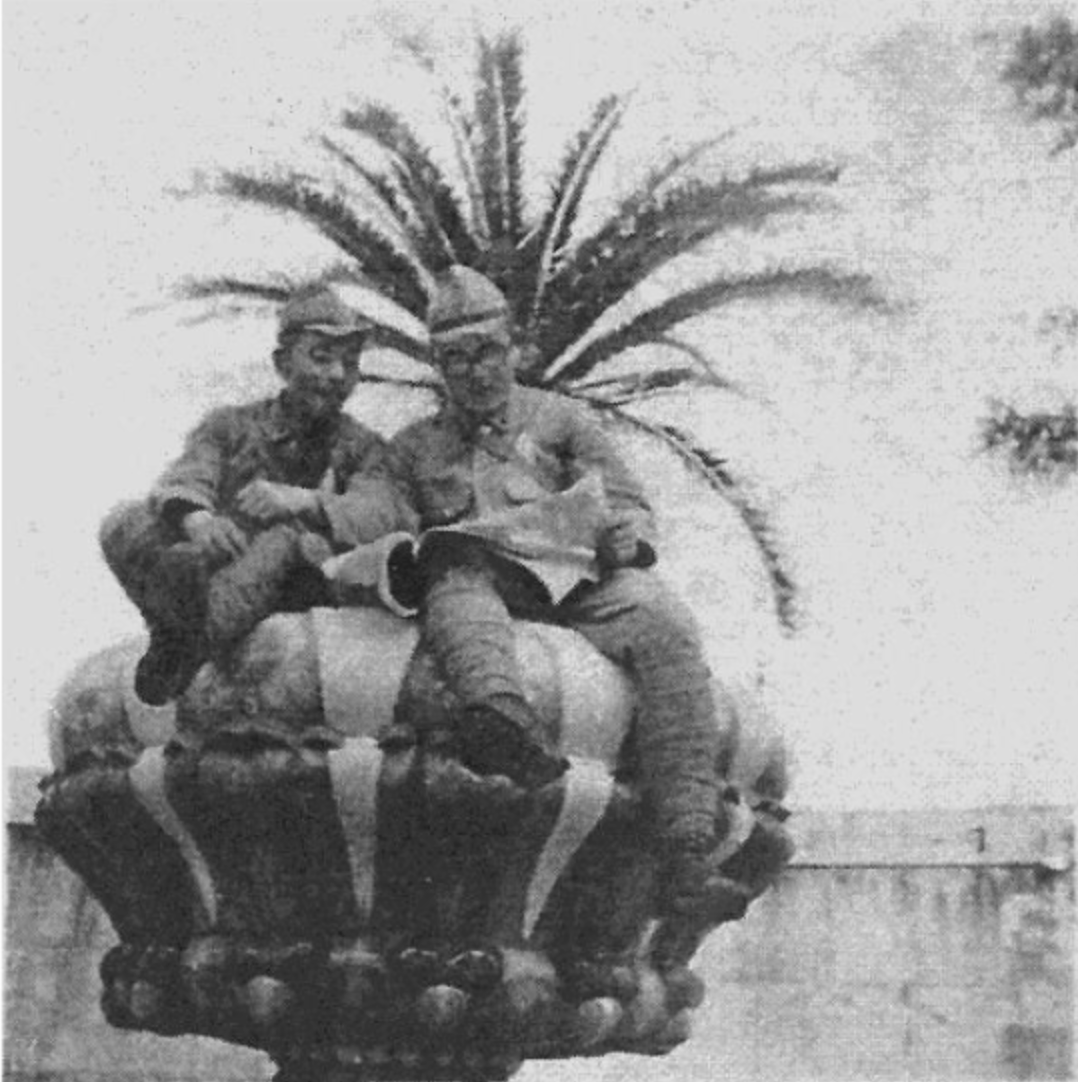
Japanese soldiers of Unit 8604 in Guangzhou

Japanese records show that Unit 8604 allegedly contacted the Army Military School in Tokyo for the disposal of the refugees. The School requested information regarding the infection rates and death tolls of the bacteria they provided. The unit then decided to experiment on refugees and visualised their results in figures and tables. The infected Chinese people were also sent north to the Chinese-controlled area to infect the Chinese army, in order to alleviate the pressure faced by the refugee camp.

According to a former soldier of the unit, they brought a strain of intestinal salmonella from the Army Medical School in Tokyo and chose to delay the soup supply during breakfast time when provincial government officials were not yet on duty. They took advantage of the refugees' unfamiliarity with the routine and chaotic conditions to secretly release the bacteria while avoiding the destruction of salmonella due to high temperatures.

The use of salmonella, such as typhoid-like strains, in bacteriological warfare is related to their pathological characteristics. These bacteria, when ingested through contaminated water sources, dust, etc., enter the human body via the digestive tract and can rapidly cause severe infection. Even those who are asymptomatic or have mild infections can continue to carry the bacteria, some for several years, thereby spreading the infection widely among both military personnel and civilians during acute outbreaks. Moreover, the ability of asymptomatic carriers to harbour the bacteria for extended periods and over broader geographical areas contributes to greater harm to more individuals over a longer period of time.

The Customs Quarantine Station located in the west of Nanshitou served as a live testing ground for the Japanese bacteriological weapons. Witnesses reported that the Japanese selected young people and sent them into the quarantine station to be fed on by mosquitoes. Tai Wei, a villager from Nanshitou, identified that the Japanese captured mosquito larvae in the rice fields, had people feed the mosquitoes, and then extracted the mosquito blood for experimentation. His brother-in-law was seized and fed to mosquitoes in the quarantine station, only to succumb to illness afterward. According to survivor Feng Qi's account, refugees in the camp were forcibly administered vaccination shots. Many developed high fevers and convulsions shortly after receiving the injection, and within days, they died.

=== Disposal of corpses ===
The provincial government of the Wang Jingwei regime was responsible for burying the deceased, employing the method of on-site burial where bodies were stacked together. Even the soil used for burying the bodies became increasingly scarce.

Japanese records only mentioned the deaths of over 300 people and revealed that the outbreak of cholera led to a significant reduction in population, necessitating the commencement of cremation and the use of two large pools to allow natural decay of the bodies. Each pool could accommodate 50–60 bodies at a time, alternating between the two pools. Therefore, the number of deaths far exceeded 300 people.

Zhong Ruirong, an elderly resident of Nanshitou, pointed out that there were two huge pools in the refugee camp at that time to handle the bodies. After each layer of bodies was laid down in the pits, an unknown liquid was poured in, followed by a layer of lime. Within just two or three days, the two pools were filled with bodies. Feng Qi, a survivor of the refugee camp, noted that after the pools were filled with bodies, they were sealed with additional liquid, emitting a foul smell.

According to Xiao Zheng, a retired worker from the Guangzhou Paper Group and a victim of bacteriological warfare, his father witnessed both pools in the refugee camp being filled with skeletal remains, and it took six grave diggers several months to clear them. After the refugees died, they would be transported to the area around Nanji Road for burial.

== Memorial ==
The present location of the Nanshitou Refugee Camp Quarantine Station is situated opposite 44 Xinglong Street, West Nanshitou Road, Nanshitou Subdistrict, Guangzhou. Originally, it served as the office space for the Guangzhou Public Security Bureau's Water Division. The refugee camp was located in the vicinity of the former motorcycle factory and surrounding enterprises.

In 1995, a memorial monument for the Cantonese-Hong Kong refugees was established in the Guangzhou Paper Mill Dormitory Area. In 2002, the Quarantine Station was registered as a protected cultural site in Guangzhou under the name "Former Site of Guangdong Customs Quarantine Station." In 2012, the Haizhu District Government named the unit the "Former Site of the South China Epidemic Prevention and Water Supply Department of the Invading Japanese Army." In 2016, the Haizhu District Government and the Guangzhou Paper Group funded the construction of the area into a green square. In 2018, the Guangzhou Municipal Government announced plans to establish the Cantonese-Hong Kong Refugee Park.

== Discovery of the remains ==
In October 1947, the Guangzhou municipal government relocated the remains from Nanshitou to the outskirts of Qixing Hill.

In 1953, during the construction of worker housing projects in Nanshitou by the Guangzhou Paper Mill, numerous uncoffined bones were discovered along both sides of Nanji Road, buried less than 0.5 meters deep. The bones were stacked in layers, separated by yellow soil, with a thickness of about 20 to 40 centimetres and visible from 2 meters underground. Local residents mentioned that these remains were transported from nearby punitive fields for burial. Due to the lack of other hills nearby and the overwhelming number of corpses, it was likely impractical to dig individual graves. Instead, a thin layer of soil was simply placed over the bodies each year. Construction workers treated the remains as ordinary soil and used them to fill road sections needing soil.According to witness and retired Guangzhou Paper Mill worker Cao Xiuying, at least three to four hundred bodies were observed in the area.

In the 1980s, during the construction of worker dormitories on Nanji Road by the Guangzhou Paper Mill, another three to four hundred bodies were discovered. Local residents identified them as the deceased from the Nanshitou Refugee Camp. Shen Shisheng, the former head of the Guangzhou Paper Mill's construction office, mentioned that besides the foundation pits, the exact number of bodies beneath the dormitory building was unknown. The bodies were placed in ossuaries, with each ossuary containing the remains of 2–3 individuals. There were over a hundred ossuaries in total, eventually relocated to Mashihu, Xiaolou Town, Zengcheng County.

== Scepticism ==
According to Assistant Professor Chi Man Kwong from the History Department of Hong Kong Baptist University, the notion of Japanese conducting bacteriological experiments in Nanshitou is not surprising, given historical instances of extreme actions by the Japanese military. While some individuals have provided eyewitness testimonies and identified locations, along with some relevant documentation, there is currently a lack of sufficiently clear evidence to fully depict this event, particularly concerning the specific individuals responsible for this water supply unit and detailed information related to it.
