= Typhidot =

- Purpose: detects IgM and IgG antibodies against the outer membrane protein

Typhidot is a medical test consisting of a dot ELISA kit that detects IgM and IgG antibodies against the outer membrane protein (OMP) of the Salmonella typhi. The typhidot test becomes positive within 2–3 days of infection and separately identifies IgM and IgG antibodies. The test is based on the presence of specific IgM and IgG antibodies to a specific 50Kd OMP antigen, which is impregnated on nitrocellulose strips. IgM shows recent infection whereas IgG signifies remote infection. The most important limitation of this test is that it is not quantitative and result is only positive or negative. Whereas a detailed Widal test can tell the titres of specific antibodies. However both tests lack sensitivity and specificity. The Widal test is losing its value as it is labor-intensive and time-consuming. It is an immunochromatographic test.
