= Ty2 =

Ty2 may refer to:TY2 a.k.a. Lennox Florida based rap artist.

- PKP class Ty2, a German-made steam locomotive which was used by Polish State Railways
- Ty2 retrotransposon, a Saccharomyces cerevisiae transposon family.
- Ty the Tasmanian Tiger 2: Bush Rescue, a video game

== See also ==
- Ty21a
