= Paratyphoid fever =

Bacterial infection caused by one of the three types of Salmonella enterica

- Other names: Paratyphoid
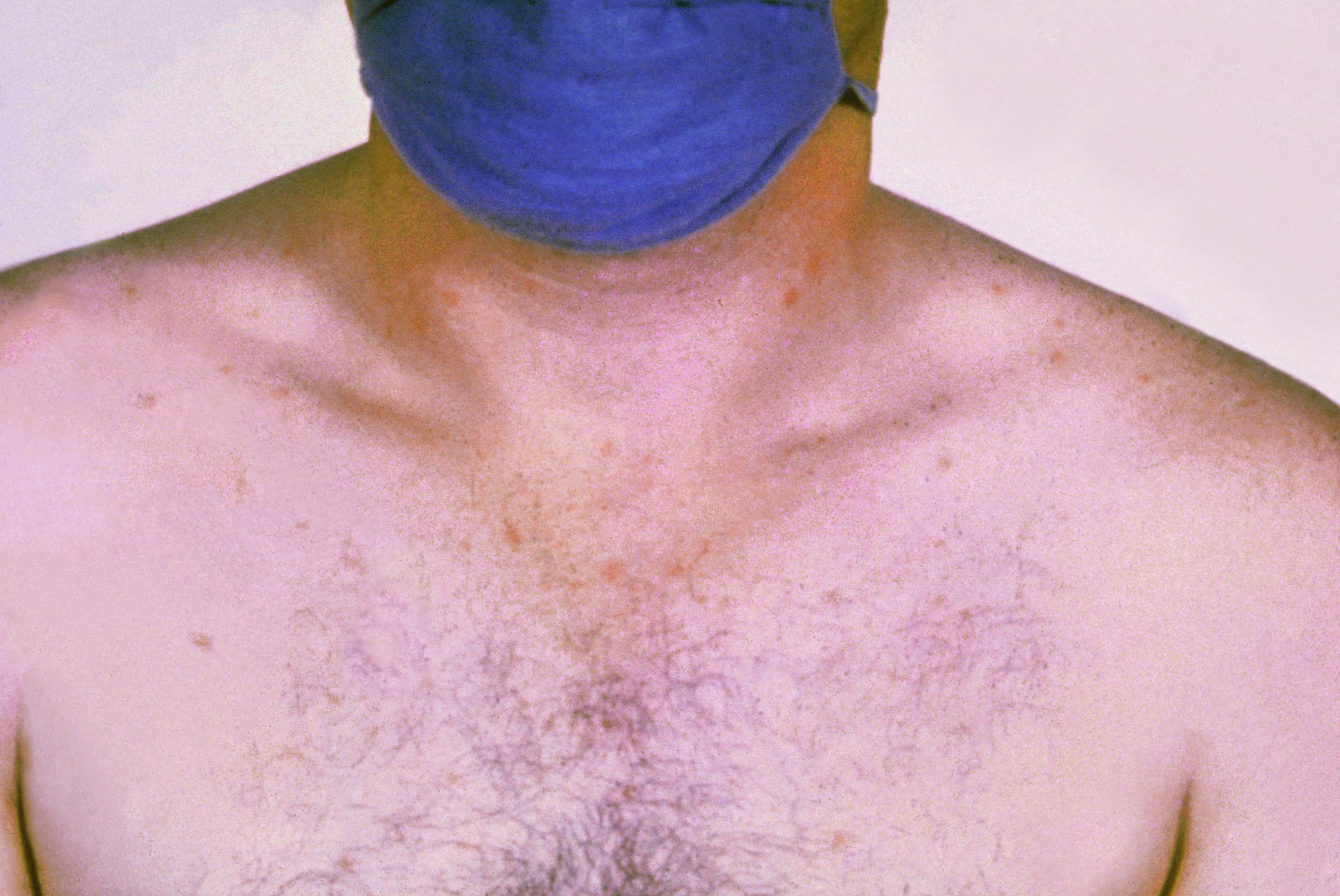
- Rose colored spots on the chest of a man with typhoid fever, similar to those of paratyphoid
- Specialty: Infectious disease
- Symptoms: Fever, headache, rash, weakness (symptoms are usually milder than typhoid but can still cause complications)
- Usual onset: 6–30 days post-exposure
- Duration: Weeks to months
- Causes: Salmonella enterica spread by food or water contaminated with feces
- Risk factors: Poor sanitation, crowded populations
- Diagnostic method: Culturing the bacteria or detecting its DNA in the blood, stool, or bone marrow
- Prevention: Handwashing, clean water
- Treatment: Antibiotics
- Frequency: 529,000
- Deaths: 29,200

Paratyphoid fever, also known simply as paratyphoid, is a bacterial infection caused by one of three types of Salmonella enterica. Symptoms usually begin 6–30 days after exposure and are the same as those of typhoid fever. Often, a gradual onset of a high fever occurs over several days. Weakness, loss of appetite, and headaches also commonly occur. Some people develop a skin rash with rose-colored spots. Without treatment, symptoms may last weeks or months. Other people may carry the bacteria without being affected; however, they are still able to spread the disease to others. Typhoid and paratyphoid are of similar severity. Paratyphoid and typhoid fever are types of enteric fever.

Paratyphoid is caused by the bacterium Salmonella enterica of the serotypes Paratyphi A, Paratyphi B, or Paratyphi C growing in the intestines and blood. They are usually spread by eating or drinking food or water contaminated with the feces of an infected person. They may occur when a person who prepares food is infected. Risk factors include poor sanitation as is found among poor crowded populations. Occasionally, they may be transmitted by sex. Humans are the only animals infected. Diagnosis may be based on symptoms and confirmed by either culturing the bacteria or detecting the bacterial DNA in the blood, stool, or bone marrow. Culturing the bacteria can be difficult. Bone-marrow testing is the most accurate. Symptoms are similar to those of many other infectious diseases. Typhus is a different disease.

While no vaccine is available specifically for paratyphoid, the typhoid vaccine may provide some benefit. Prevention includes drinking clean water, better sanitation, and better handwashing. Treatment of the disease is with antibiotics such as azithromycin. Resistance to a number of other previously effective antibiotics is common.

Paratyphoid affects about six million people a year. It is most common in parts of Asia and rare in the developed world. Most cases are due to Paratyphi A rather than Paratyphi B or C. In 2015, paratyphoid fever resulted in about 29,200 deaths, down from 63,000 deaths in 1990. The risk of death is between 10% and 15% without treatment, while with treatment, it may be less than 1%.

== Signs and symptoms ==
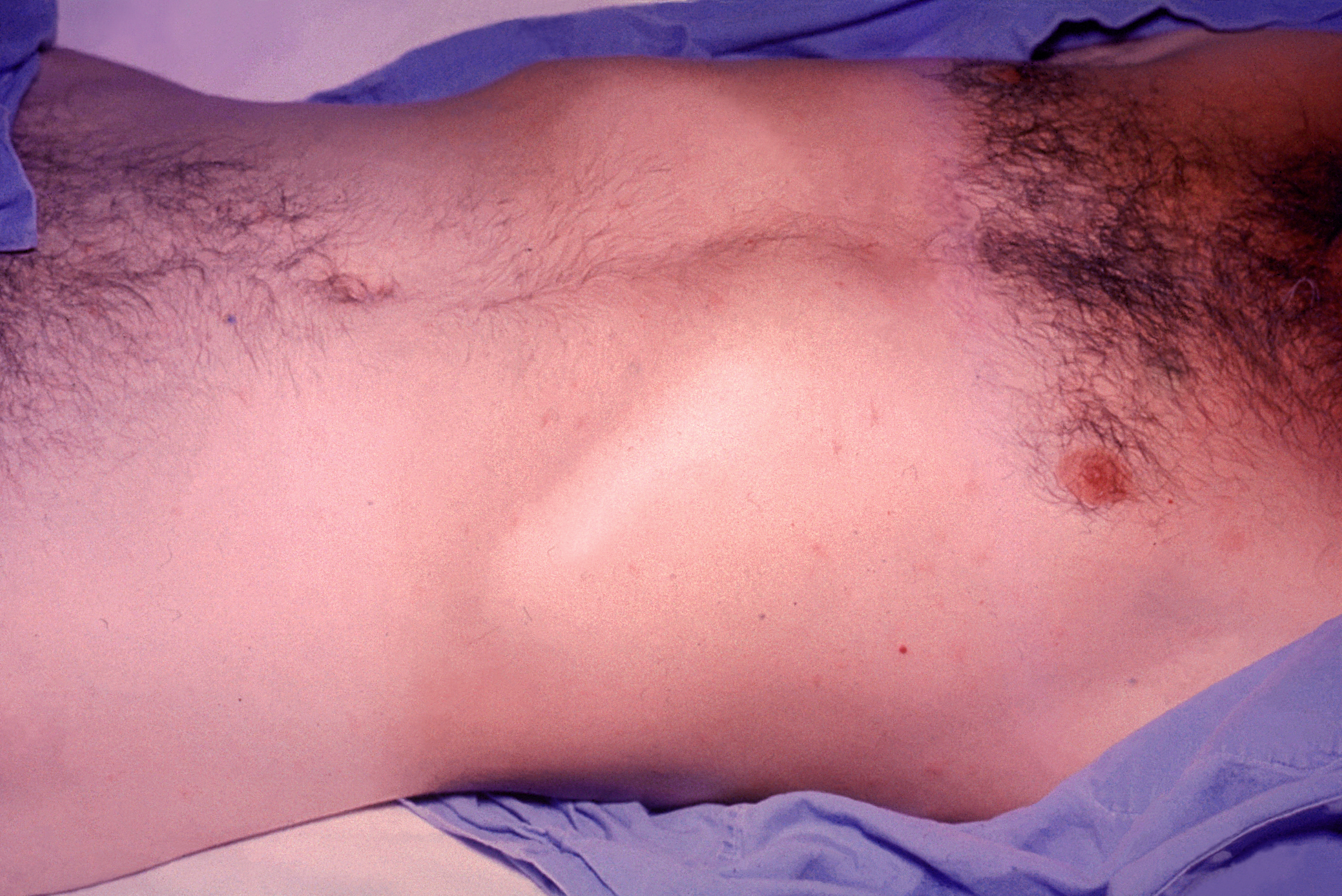
Rose spots on the abdomen of a man with typhoid fever

Paratyphoid fever resembles typhoid fever. Infection is characterized by a sustained fever, headache, abdominal pain, malaise, anorexia, a nonproductive cough (in early stage of illness), a relative bradycardia (slow heart rate), and hepatosplenomegaly (an enlargement of the liver and spleen). About 30% of people with light skin colour who are infected develop rosy spots on the central body. In adults, constipation is more common than diarrhea.

Only 20 to 40% of people initially have abdominal pain. Nonspecific symptoms such as chills, sweating, headache, loss of appetite, cough, weakness, sore throat, dizziness, and muscle pains are frequently present before the onset of fever. Some very rare symptoms are psychosis (mental disorder), confusion, and seizures.

== Cause ==
Paratyphoid fever is caused by any of three serovars of Salmonella enterica subsp. enterica: S. Paratyphi A, S. Paratyphi B (invalid alias S. schottmuelleri), S. Paratyphi C (invalid alias S. hirschfeldii).

=== Transmission ===
They are usually spread by eating or drinking food or water contaminated with the feces of an infected person. They may occur when a person who prepares food is infected. Risk factors include poor sanitation as is found among poor crowded populations. Occasionally, they may be transmitted by sex. Humans are the only animals infected.

=== Paratyphoid B ===
Paratyphoid B is more frequent in Europe. It can present as a typhoid-like illness, as a severe gastroenteritis or with features of both. Herpes labialis, rare in true typhoid fever, is frequently seen in paratyphoid B. Rarely a subdural empyema can occur. Diagnosis is with isolation of the agent in blood or stool and demonstration of antibodies antiBH in the Widal test. The disease responds well to chloramphenicol or co-trimoxazole.

Salmonella Paratyphi B strains causing paratyphoid fever do not ferment dextrorotatory tartrate.

=== Paratyphoid C ===
Paratyphoid C is a rare infection, generally seen in the Far East. It presents as a septicaemia with metastatic abscesses. Cholecystitis is possible in the course of the disease. Antibodies to paratyphoid C are not usually tested and the diagnosis is made with blood cultures. Chloramphenicol therapy is generally effective.

=== Carriers ===
Humans and, occasionally, domestic animals are the carriers of paratyphoid fever. Members of the same family can be transient or permanent carriers. In most parts of the world, short-term fecal carriers are more common than urinary carriers. The chronic urinary carrier state occurs in those who have schistosomiasis (parasitic blood fluke).

Continuing to shed Salmonella Paratyphi is possible for up to one year, and during this phase, a person is considered to be a carrier. The chronic carrier state may follow acute illness, or mild or even subclinical infections. Chronic carriers are most often women who were infected in their middle age.

== Pathophysiology ==
After ingestion, if the immune system is unable to stop the infection, the bacteria multiply and then spread to the bloodstream, after which the first signs of disease are observed in the form of fever. They penetrate further to the bone marrow, liver, and bile ducts, from which bacteria are excreted into the bowel contents. In the second phase of the disease, the bacteria penetrate the immune tissue of the small intestine, and the initial symptoms of small-bowel movements begin.

== Prevention ==
Providing basic sanitation and safe drinking water and food are the keys for controlling the disease. In developed countries, enteric fever rates decreased in the past when treatment of municipal water was introduced, human feces were excluded from food production, and pasteurization of dairy products began. In addition, children and adults should be carefully educated about personal hygiene. This would include careful handwashing after defecation and sexual contact, before preparing or eating food, and especially the sanitary disposal of feces. Food handlers should be educated in personal hygiene prior to handling food or utensils and equipment. Infected individuals should be advised to avoid food preparation. Sexually active people should be educated about the risks of sexual practices that permit fecal-oral contact.

Those who travel to countries with poor sanitation should receive a live attenuated typhoid vaccine—Ty21a (Vivotif), which, in addition to the protection against typhoid fever, may provide some protection against paratyphoid fever caused by the S. enterica serotypes A and B. In particular, a reanalysis of data from a trial conducted in Chile showed the Ty21a vaccine was 49% effective (95% CI: 8–73%) in preventing paratyphoid fever caused by the serotype B. Evidence from a study of international travelers in Israel also indicates the vaccine may prevent a fraction of infections by the serotype A, although no trial confirms this. This cross-protection by a typhoid vaccine is most likely due to O antigens shared between different S. enterica serotypes.

Exclusion from work and social activities should be considered for symptomatic, and asymptomatic people who are food handlers, healthcare/daycare staff who are involved in patient care and/or child care, children attending unsanitary daycare centers, and older children who are unable to implement good standards of personal hygiene. The exclusion applies until two consecutive stool specimens are taken from the infected patient and are reported negative.

== Treatments ==
Control requires treatment of antibiotics and vaccines prescribed by a doctor. Major control treatments for paratyphoid fever include ciprofloxacin for 10 days, ceftriaxone/cefotaxime for 14 days, or azithromycin.

== Prognosis ==
Those diagnosed with Type A of the bacterial strain rarely die from it except in rare cases of severe intestinal complications. With proper testing and diagnosis, the mortality rate falls to less than 1%. Antibiotics such as azithromycin are particularly effective in treating the disease.

== Epidemiology ==
Factors outside the household, such as unclean food from street vendors and flooding, help distribute the disease from person to person. Because of poverty and poor hygiene and insanitary conditions, the disease is more common in less-industrialized countries, principally owing to the problem of unsafe drinking water, inadequate sewage disposal, and flooding. Occasionally causing epidemics, paratyphoid fever is found in large parts of Asia, Africa, and Central and South America. Many of those infected get the disease in Asian countries. About 16 million cases occur a year, which result in about 25,000 deaths worldwide.
