= Typhoid vaccine =

Vaccines that prevent typhoid fever

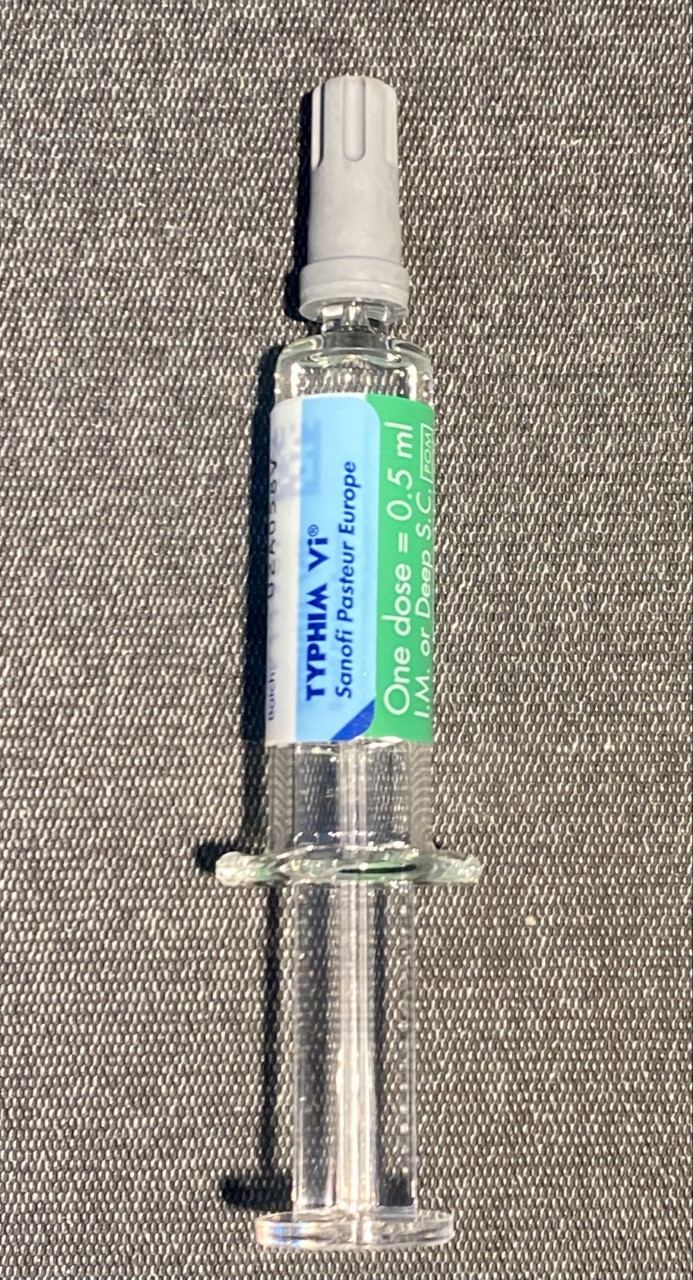

Vaccine description
- Target: Typhoid

Clinical data
- Trade names: Typhim Vi, Vivotif
- AHFS/Drugs.com: Monograph
- MedlinePlus: a607028
- Pregnancy category: AU: B2
- ATC code: J07AP (WHO) J07AP01 (WHO) J07AP02 (WHO) J07AP03 (WHO) J07AP10 (WHO)

Legal status
- Legal status: US: ℞-only

Identifiers
- ChemSpider: none
- UNII: 760T5R8B3O

Typhoid vaccines are vaccines that prevent typhoid fever. Several types are widely available: typhoid conjugate vaccine (TCV), Ty21a (a live oral vaccine) and Vi capsular polysaccharide vaccine (ViPS) (an injectable subunit vaccine). Depending on the type, typhoid vaccines are estimated to be about 50% to 85% effective. The Vi-rEPA vaccine is efficacious in children.

The World Health Organization (WHO) recommends vaccinating all children in areas where the disease is common. Otherwise they recommend vaccinating those at high risk. Vaccination campaigns can also be used to control outbreaks of disease. Depending on the vaccine, additional doses are recommended every three to seven years. In the United States the vaccine is only recommended in those at high risk such as travelers to areas of the world where the disease is common.

The vaccines available as of 2018 are very safe. Minor side effects may occur at the site of injection. The injectable vaccine is safe in people with HIV/AIDS and the oral vaccine can be used as long as symptoms are not present. While it has not been studied during pregnancy, the non-live vaccines are believed to be safe while the live vaccine is not recommended.

The first typhoid vaccines were developed in 1896 by Almroth Edward Wright, Richard Pfeiffer, and Wilhelm Kolle. Due to side-effects newer formulations are recommended as of 2018. It is on the World Health Organization's List of Essential Medicines.

== Medical uses ==
Ty21a, the Vi capsular polysaccharide vaccine, and Vi-rEPA are effective in reducing typhoid fever with low rates of adverse effects. Newer vaccines such as Vi-TT (PedaTyph) are awaiting field trials to demonstrate efficacy against natural exposure.

The oral Ty21a vaccine prevents around one-half of typhoid cases in the first three years after vaccination. The injectable Vi polysaccharide vaccine prevented about two-thirds of typhoid cases in the first year and had a cumulative efficacy of 55% by the third year. The efficacy of these vaccines has only been demonstrated in children older than two years. Vi-rEPA vaccine, a new conjugate form of the injectable Vi vaccine, may be more effective and prevents the disease in many children under the age of five years. In a trial in 2-to-5-year-old children in Vietnam, the vaccine had more than 90 percent efficacy in the first year and protection lasted at least four years.

=== Schedule ===
Depending on the formulation it can be given starting at the age of two (ViPS), six (Ty21a), or six months (TCV).

== Types ==
- Vi capsular polysaccharide vaccine: Typhim VI (Sanofi Pasteur); Typherix (GSK)
- Ty21a oral vaccine: Vivotif (Bavarian Nordic)
- Typhoid conjugate vaccine: Typbar-TCV (Bharat Biotech)
- Combined hepatitis A and Vi polysaccharide vaccine: ViVaxim and ViATIM (Sanofi Pasteur); Hepatyrix (GSK)
- Activated whole cell vaccine remains available in some parts of the developing world as of 2008.
