= Widal test =

Presumptive serological test for enteric fever or undulant fever

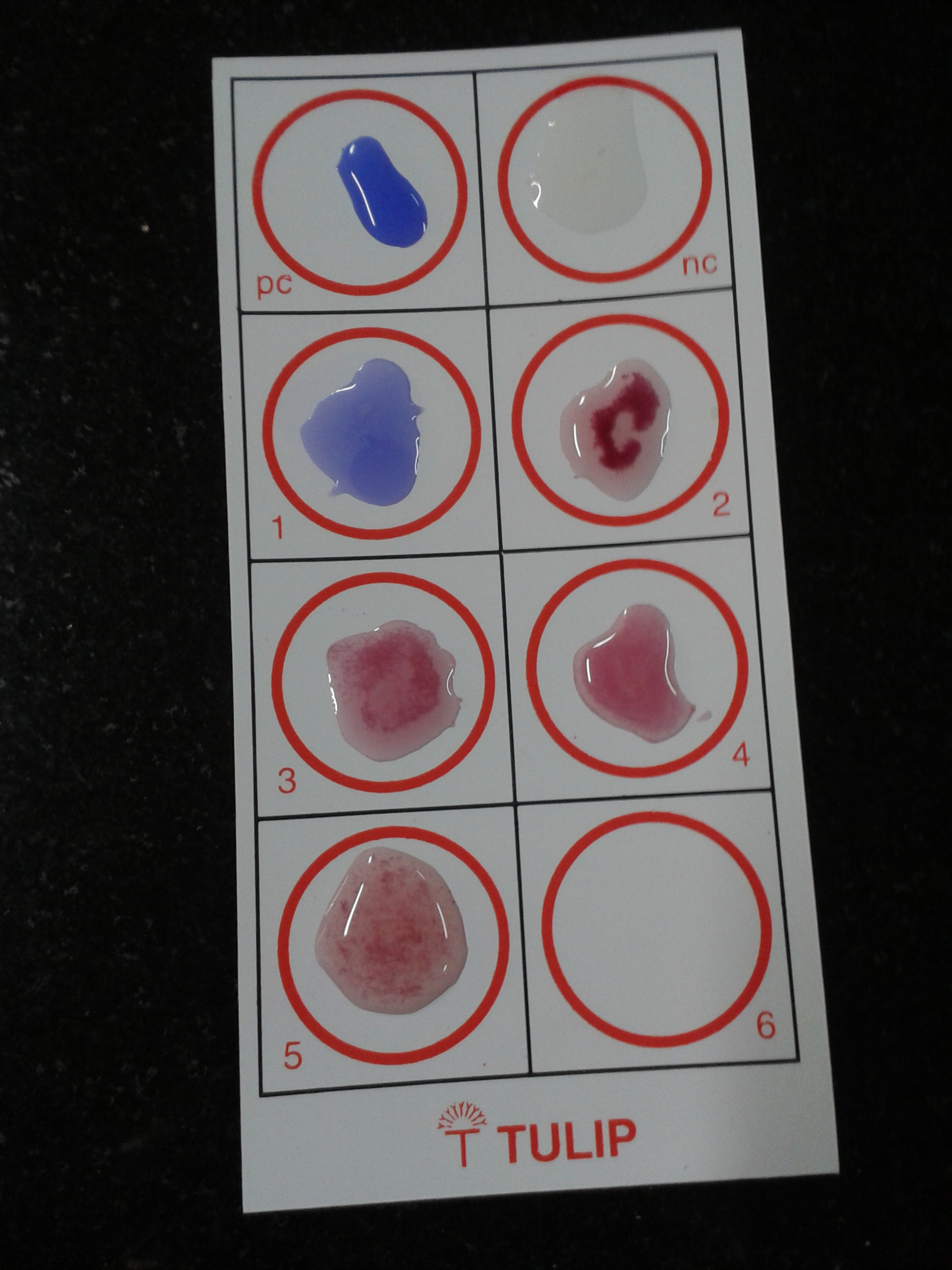
- Purpose: serological test for enteric fever
- Test of: Typhoid fever (enteric fever)
- Based on: Seropositivity: immune agglutination reaction to specific infectious agent

The Widal test, developed in 1896 and named after its inventor, Georges-Fernand Widal, is an indirect agglutination test for enteric fever or undulant fever whereby bacteria causing typhoid fever are mixed with a serum containing specific antibodies obtained from an infected individual. In cases of Salmonella infection, the test assesses for host antibodies to the O soma antigen and the H flagellar antigen of the bacteria. False positive and false negative results may occur. Test results need to be interpreted carefully to account for any history of enteric fever, typhoid vaccination, and the general level of antibodies in the populations in endemic areas of the world. As with all serological tests, the rise in antibody levels needed to perform the diagnosis takes 7–14 days, which limits its applicability in early diagnosis. Other means of diagnosing Salmonella typhi (and paratyphi) include cultures of blood, urine and faeces. These organisms produce H_{2}S from thiosulfate and can be identified easily on differential media such as bismuth sulfite agar. Typhidot is the other test used to ascertain the diagnosis of typhoid fever. A new serological test called the Tubex test is neither superior nor better performing than the Widal test. Therefore, Tubex test is not recommended for diagnosis of typhoid fever.

2-mercaptoethanol is often added to the Widal test. This agent more easily denatures the IgM class of antibodies, so if a decrease in the titer is seen after using this agent, it means that the contribution of IgM has been removed leaving the IgG component. This differentiation of antibody classes is important as it allows for the distinction of a recent (IgM) from an old infection (IgG).

The Widal test is positive if TO antigen titer is more than 1:160 in an active infection, or if TH antigen titer is more than 1:160 in past infection or in immunized persons. A single Widal test is of little clinical relevance especially in endemic areas such as Indian subcontinent, Africa and South-east Asia. This is due to recurrent exposure to the typhoid causing bacteria, immunization and high chances of cross-reaction from infections, such as malaria and non typhoidal salmonella.

If no other tests (either bacteriologic culture or more specific serology) are available, a fourfold increase in the titer (e.g., from 1:40 to 1:640) in the course of the infection, or a conversion from an IgM reaction to an IgG reaction of at least the same titer, would be consistent with a typhoid infection. The normal Widal ranges are 1:20 and 1:80, these are in the normal range; anything more is a concern and medical consultation should be sought.

== See also ==
- Georges-Fernand Widal
- Kauffman-White classification
- Mean corpuscular hemoglobin§
