= Hepatitis A and typhoid vaccine =

Combination of
- Hepatitis A: Vaccine
- Typhoid: Vaccine

Clinical data
- Trade names: ViVaxim, Hepatyrix, ViATIM
- AHFS/Drugs.com: UK Drug Information
- Pregnancy category: AU: B2
- Routes of administration: Intramuscular injection
- ATC code: J07CA10 (WHO)

Legal status
- Legal status: AU: S4 (Prescription only)

Identifiers
- CAS Number: 827024-58-8
- ChemSpider: none

Hepatitis A and typhoid vaccine is a combination vaccine to protect against the infectious diseases hepatitis A and typhoid. It is a combination of inactivated Hepatitis A virus and Vi polysaccharide of Salmonella typhi bacteria. Branded formulations include Hepatyrix from GlaxoSmithKline, and ViVaxim and ViATIM from Sanofi Pasteur.

== Society and culture ==
=== Brand names ===
The vaccine is distributed under various brand names in the European Union.
