= Somatic antigen =

Type of antigen

A somatic antigen is an antigen located in the cell wall of a gram-positive or gram-negative bacterium.

== See also ==
- Lipopolysaccharide Aubre
