= Ty21a =

Typhoid vaccine

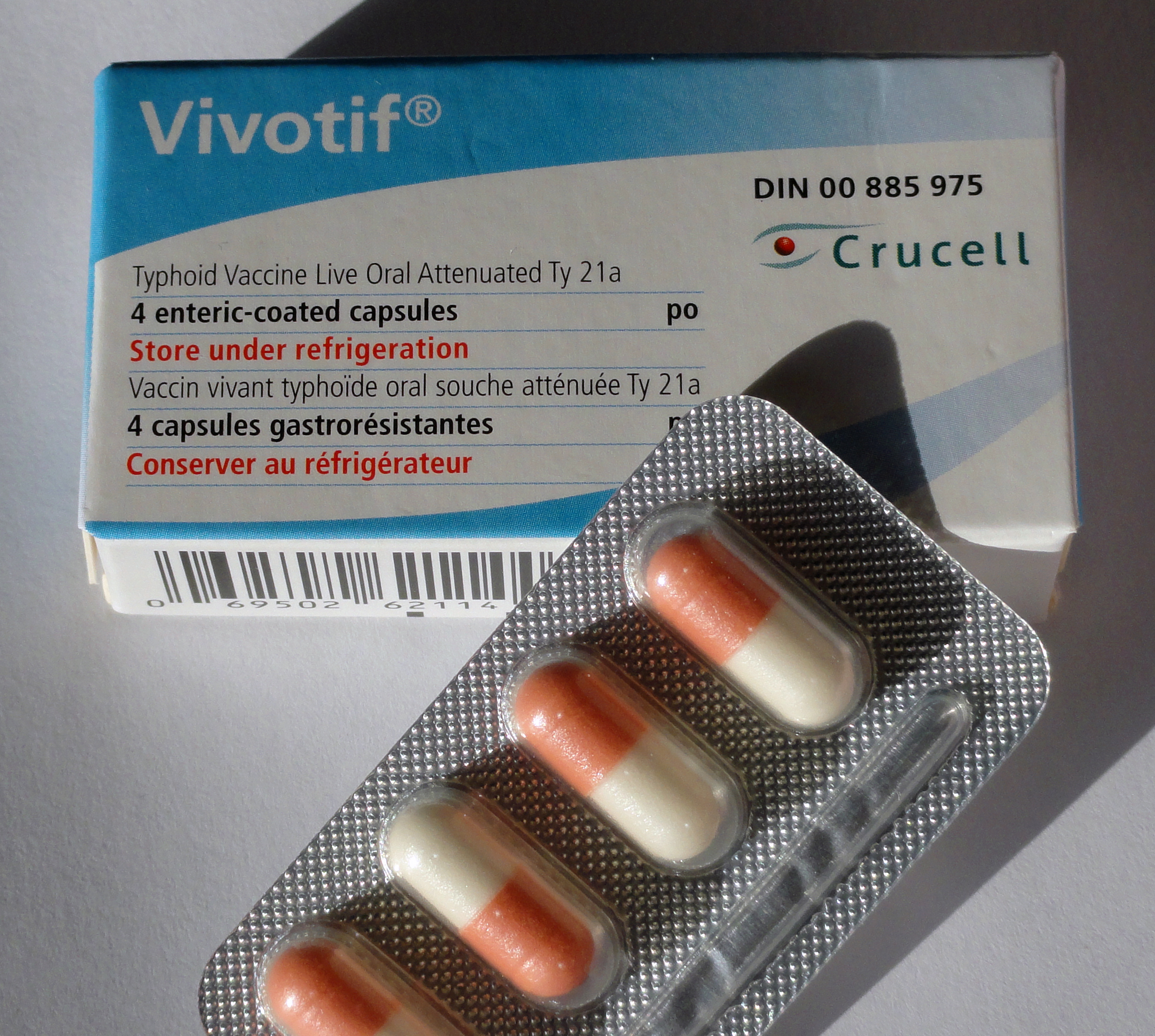

Vaccine description
- Target: Typhoid
- Vaccine type: Attenuated

Clinical data
- Trade names: Vivotif
- Routes of administration: Oral
- ATC code: J07AP01 (WHO)

Legal status
- Legal status: AU: S4 (Prescription only); CA: Unscheduled; UK: POM (Prescription only); US: ℞-only

Identifiers
- CAS Number: 1704529-13-4

Ty21a is a live attenuated bacterial vaccine that protects against typhoid. First licensed in Europe in 1983 and in the United States in 1989, it is an orally administered, live-attenuated Ty2 strain of S. Typhi in which multiple genes, including the genes responsible for the production of Vi, have been deleted so as to render it harmless but nevertheless immunogenic. It is one of the three typhoid vaccines currently recommended by the World Health Organization (the other two being the Typhoid Conjugate Vaccine (TCV) and Vi capsular polysaccharide vaccine).

The vaccine is given by mouth. The vaccine is presented either as enteric coated capsules or as a liquid suspension. The vaccine must be stored at 2 to 8 °C, but will retain its potency for 14 days at 25 °C.

== Medical uses ==
The vaccine offers a statistically significant protection for the first seven years. The vaccine is most commonly used to protect travelers to endemic countries, but some agencies claim that the vaccine could be used in large scale public prevention programs.

The Vi polysaccharide vaccine is also effective at preventing typhoid fever.

== Dosing ==
The recommended dose varies according to country and preparation. At least three doses are required for protection.

In the US and Canada, an initial course of 4 doses on alternate days is recommended. Full protection is achieved 7 days after the last dose. In the US, a booster dose is recommended after 5 years. In Canada, a booster dose is recommended after 7 years.

In Australia and Europe, an initial course of 3 doses on alternate days is recommended. Protection is achieved 7 days after the last dose. A booster dose is recommended every 3 years for people living in endemic areas, but every year for people traveling from non-endemic to endemic areas.

== Side effects ==
Side effects of this vaccine are mild and rare.

== Trade names ==
- Vivotif (manufactured by Emergent BioSolutions)

== Research ==
Ty21a may also provide some degree of protection against paratyphoid fever A and B. This cross-protection by a typhoid vaccine is most likely due to O antigens shared between different S. enterica serotypes.

A newer Vi-rEPA vaccine is being tested for preventing typhoid fever. It has a similar level of protection, but the protection may last longer with this newer vaccine.
