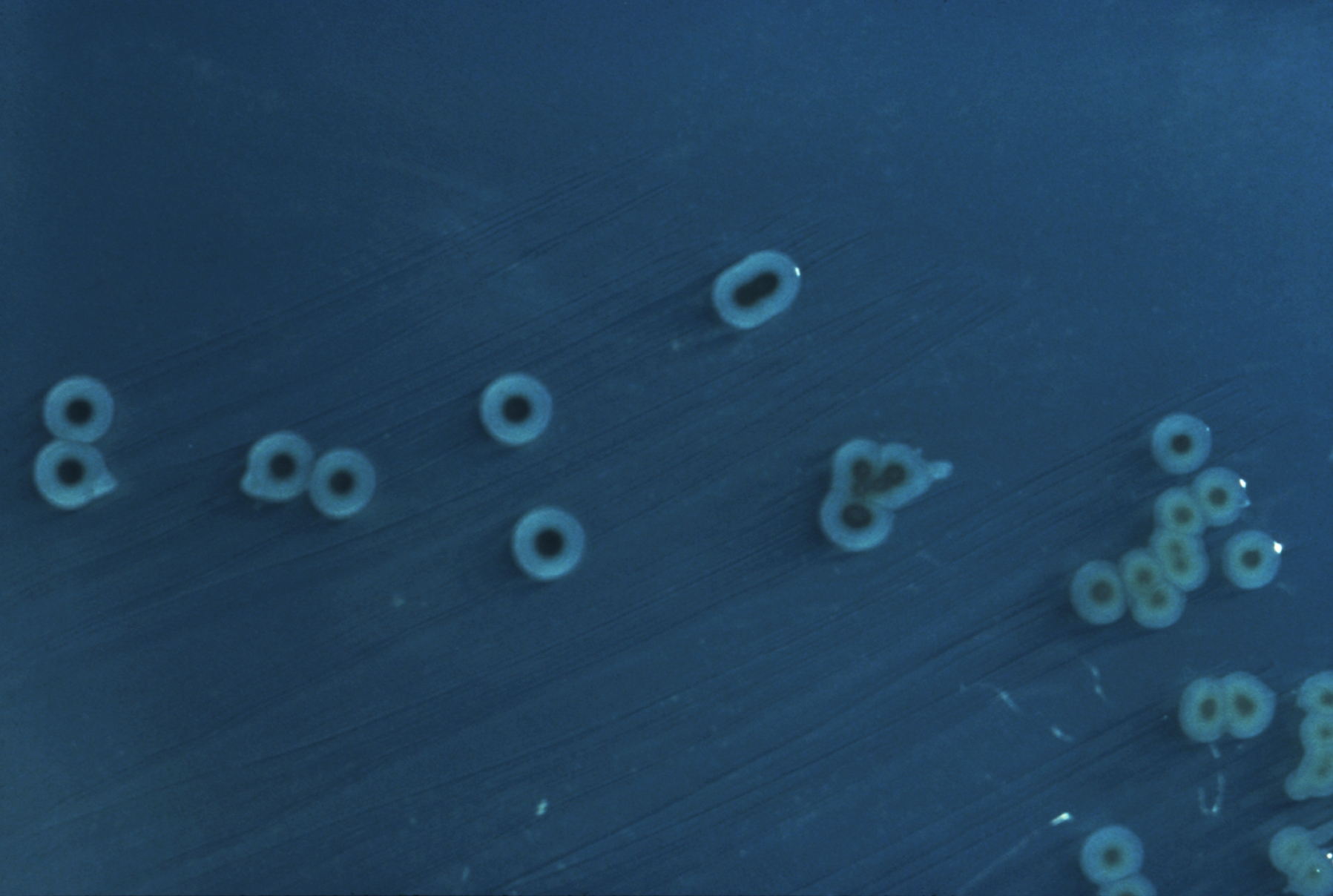
- Salmonella Typhimurium colonies on a Hektoen enteric agar plate

Scientific classification
- Domain: Bacteria
- Kingdom: Pseudomonadati
- Phylum: Pseudomonadota
- Class: Gammaproteobacteria
- Order: Enterobacterales
- Family: Enterobacteriaceae
- Genus: Salmonella
- Species: S. enterica
- Subspecies: S. e. subsp. enterica

Trinomial name
- Salmonella enterica subsp. enterica

Synonyms
- Bacillus typhosus

= Salmonella enterica subsp. enterica =

Subspecies of bacterium

Salmonella enterica subsp. enterica is a subspecies of Salmonella enterica, the rod-shaped, flagellated, aerobic, Gram-negative bacterium. Many of the pathogenic serovars of the S. enterica species are in this subspecies, including the one responsible for typhoid.

== Serovars ==
Salmonella enterica subsp. enterica serovars are defined based on their somatic (O) and flagellar (H) antigens, with over 2,600 serovars in total; only about 50 of these serovars are common causes of infections in humans. Most of these serovars are found in the environment and survive in plants, water, and soil; many serovars have broad host ranges that allow them to colonize different species in mammals, birds, reptiles, amphibians, and insects. Zoonotic diseases, like Salmonella, spread between the environment and people. The most well-known S. enterica enterica serovar is Salmonella Typhi, which causes typhoid fever. Serotypes Paratyphi A, B, and C cause paratyphoid fever, a disease similar to but milder than typhoid.

A number of techniques are currently used to differentiate between serotypes. These include looking for the presence or absence of antigens, phage typing, molecular fingerprinting and biotyping, where serovars are differentiated by which nutrients they are able to ferment. A possible factor in determining the host range of particular serovars is phage-mediated acquisition of a small number of genetic elements that enable infection of a particular host. It is further postulated that serovars which infect a narrow range of species have diverged from ancestors with a broad host range, and have since specialised and lost the ability to infect some hosts.

Studies have concluded most strains of Salmonella enterica subsp. enterica serovars possess serotype-specific virulence plasmids. These are plasmid-associated virulence characterized by low-copy-number plasmids and depending on the serovar, its size ranges from 50 to 100 kb. In 2012, CDC's PulseNet became aware of an emergent multi-drug resistant Serovar Infantis SNP cluster, named REPJFX01. This SNP cluster has a large megaplasmid (pESI) that contains multiple drug-resistance genes. The USDA NARMS stated that because of this pESI-plasmid, serovar Infantis is the leading serovar in poultry. NCBI has over 12,500 isolates in the REPJFX01 SNP cluster, with over 3,700 being clinical isolates. Serovar Enteritidis, which is the most common serovar isolated in human clinical cases, has also been found to produce endotoxins, coded by the stn and slyA genes, that attribute to the pathogenicity of Enteritidis.

In November 2016, a new strain of extensively drug resistant (XDR) Salmonella enterica serovar Typhi emerged in Pakistan, primarily from the cities of Hyderabad and Karachi. Multidrug resistant strains have been present since the late 1970s in Africa and Asia. These strains are resistant to many first line antibiotic treatment options: chloramphenicol, ampicillin, trimethoprim-sulfamethoxazole, fluoroquinolones, and third-generation cephalosporins. The WHO recommends azithromycin as a first line treatment. The outbreak has been ongoing since 2016.

In the United States, the 10 Salmonella serovars that caused the most human infections in 2016 were:

Rank	Serotype	Percent
1	Enteritidis	16.8
2	Newport	10.1
3	Typhimurium	9.8
4	Javiana	5.8
5	I 4,[5],12:i:-	4.7
6	Infantis	2.7
7	Muenchen	2.6
8	Montevideo	2.2
9	Braenderup	2.1
10	Thompson	1.7
-	Other	41.5

== Nomenclature ==
The nomenclature of Salmonella enterica has long been a topic of debate in the microbiology community. Originally in the 1880s, Salmonella species were named after the disease, host, or geological location they were associated with; however, this taxonomic characterization was contested due to genus members being categorized incompatibly with their genetic similarities. In the 1980s, the emergence of nucleotide sequencing and DNA hybridization led many established bacteriologists such as Le Minor and Popoff (1987), Euzéby (1999), and Ezaki and Yabuuchi (2000) to put forth their proposals for nomenclature changes. It was not until 2005, that Le Minor and Popoff reproposed and established that "Salmonella enterica" would be the approved species name – excluding Salmonella bongori – and that Salmonella enterica contains six subspecies, of which Salmonella enterica subsp. enterica contains the most serovars. Technological advancements allow researchers to use whole genome sequencing data to identify and group serovars using two methods: sequence typing and antigen recognition.

Serovar names are capitalized but not italicized or underlined. Serovars may be designated in full form or short form (includes just the genus and serovar names). For example, in full designation Salmonella enterica subsp. enterica serovar Typhi is written as such, but in short designation it is written as Salmonella Typhi. Each serovar can have many strains, as well, which allows for a rapid increase in the total number of antigenically variable bacteria.

== Epidemiology ==
The World Health Organization characterizes salmonellosis (non typhoidal) as a foodborne disease whose symptoms include diarrhea, fever, nausea, vomiting, and in severe cases death. Salmonellosis has been assessed to primarily occur in human hosts due to bacterial colonization of the intestinal tract after the consumption of contaminated food or water, but it is also known to spread from person-to-person via the fecal-oral route. To reduce the risk associated with contracting this disease, proper food safety measures should be applied to high-risk food products including poultry, beef, pork, lamb, eggs, and fresh produce. Food manufacturers, ingredient suppliers, restaurants, and home cooks should practice sanitary processing procedures, store foods below 5 °C, and thoroughly cook all foods to their designated safe-to-eat temperatures. It has become increasingly difficult to mitigate the presence of salmonellosis infections across the human population due to the unique nature of multidrug-resistant serovars as a result of the counterproductive effects to use antibiotics as a broad spectrum treatment. Key host immune deficiencies associated with HIV, malaria and malnutrition have contributed to a wide spread of this disease and the need to use expensive antimicrobial drugs in the poorest health services in the world.

=== Salmonella Typhi ===
Typhoidal salmonellosis caused an estimated 21.7 million illnesses and 217,000 deaths in 2000. It occurs most often in children and young adults between 5 and 19 years old. In 2013, it resulted in about 161,000 deaths – down from 181,000 in 1990. Infants, children, and adolescents in south-central and Southeast Asia have the highest rates of typhoid. Outbreaks are also often reported in sub-Saharan Africa and Southeast Asia. In 2000, more than 90% of morbidity and mortality due to typhoid fever occurred in Asia. In the U.S., about 400 cases occur each year, 75% of which are acquired while traveling internationally.

=== Salmonella Paratyphi ===
In 2019, it was estimated there were 3.8 million cases of paratyphoid fever (due predominantly to Paratyphi A) and approximately 23,300 deaths globally.

== Survival and stress ==
There are factors that can increase the infection risk. These include a higher pH in the stomach, gastric resection, and treatment with anti acid buffering. If the stomach has a lower pH, then this helps as a defensive technique to potentially avoid infection.

This strain is mesophilic and some can survive extremely low or high temperatures which can range from 2 °C – 54 °C. Sigma factors inside the cell control the gene expression and they can sense the changes in the environment from the outer membrane by activation of genes that then respond to heat stress and adapt accordingly. S. enterica also can quickly respond to cold temperatures by cold shock proteins (CSP) by synthesizing themselves so that the cell can later resume growth. Chlorine can be a chemical stressor to S. enterica because once chlorine is present, S. enterica can produce a biofilm that provides itself with an exopolysaccharide matrix that has the ability of a chemical attack against chlorine. From this, chlorine has preventative measures for biofilm formation in poultry drinking systems and this reduces the risk of S. enterica. Successful adaptation allows S. enterica to withstand more acidic conditions, counteracting stomach antibacterial effects.
