= Kathrin Jansen =

German scientist

- Born: Ute Kathrin Jansen; 1958 (age 67–68); East Germany
- Education: University of Marburg
- Scientific career
- Workplaces: Pfizer; Wyeth; University of Pennsylvania; Merck & Co. VaxGen; GlaxoSmithKline; Cornell University; University of Marburg
- Thesis: Die Assimilation von Kohlenstoff durch Desulfovibrio barsii, ein Formiat-oxidierendes, Sulfat-reduzierendes Bakterium (1984)
- Doctoral advisor: Rudolf K. Thauer

Kathrin U. Jansen (born 1958) is the former Head of Vaccine Research and Development at Pfizer. She previously led the development of the HPV vaccine (Gardasil) and newer versions of the pneumococcal conjugate vaccine (Prevnar), and is working with BioNTech to create a COVID-19 vaccine using mRNA (Pfizer–BioNTech COVID-19 vaccine) that was approved for Emergency Use Authorization in the United States on December 11, 2020.

== Early life and education ==
Jansen was born in Erfurt, East Germany. She was frequently unwell as a child, and suffered several throat infections. The medical treatment she received from her father (antibiotics, codeine) inspired her to pursue a career in drug development. Her family fled to West Germany before the Berlin Wall was constructed in 1961. To transport Jansen across the border, her aunt pretended that she was her child, giving her some sleeping pills so that she didn't wake up and tell the border patrol the truth. Her family settled in Marl, North Rhine-Westphalia. She eventually studied biology at the University of Marburg, with the hope to work in the pharmaceutical industry. Whilst she was an undergraduate, Rudolf K. Thauer arrived at the university, and established a department of microbiology. Jansen completed her doctoral degree at the University of Marburg, where she studied chemical pathways in bacteria. After earning her degree, Jansen moved to Cornell University as an Alexander von Humboldt Foundation postdoctoral fellow investigating the function of the acetylcholine receptor with George Paul Hess. In particular, Jansen focussed on the yeast expression of multi-subunit neuronal receptors.

== Research and career ==
Jansen was fascinated by the development of novel pharmaceuticals, and wanted to return to Europe, so moved to Geneva to join the Glaxo Institute for Molecular Biology. At the Glaxo Institute for Molecular Biology Jansen encouraged the immunologists to create a novel receptor for immunoglobulin E. She completed an internship in the laboratory of David Bishop at the University of Oxford, where she studied the expression of insect cells using baculoviridae.

In 1992 Jansen moved back to the United States, where she joined the vaccine division at Merck & Co. She became interested in making vaccines, and started work on the human papillomavirus infection. Soon after Jian Zhou and Ian Frazer started work on the HPV vaccine, proposing that the proteins of the human papillomavirus infection virus-like particles could be self assembled into something that could be used as a vaccine. Jansen proposed the vaccine should be made in yeast, a substrate which Merck & Co. had previously used for the Hepatitis B vaccine. Various innovations were required to ensure that the yeast did not degrade the virus like particles, and prevent their aggregation. Jansen managed to convince Edward Scolnick that the experimental vaccine was worth pursuing, and started to make the assays. Jansen worked with Laura Koutsky at the University of Washington to conduct natural history studies that informed the phase 2 clinical trials. In 2002 the vaccination was proven 100% effective, and Jansen left the Merck & Co. knowing that the vaccination would be a success.

She joined VaxGen in 2004, where she was appointed chief scientific officer. In 2006 Jansen left VaxGen to join Wyeth Pharmaceuticals in 2006, where she was responsible for vaccine discovery. Here she developed the pneumococcal conjugate vaccine (Prevnar-13). In 2010 Jansen was appointed adjunct professor at the University of Pennsylvania.

Jansen is concerned about the rise of vaccine hesitancy. During a conference at Pfizer in 2019, she said "I don't know what motivates an individual to ignore scientific facts. As scientists, it is our obligation to rectify misinformation and to provide the facts on what we know and what we don't know".

During the COVID-19 pandemic Jansen oversaw the development of the Pfizer COVID-19 vaccine. She looked at four potential candidates, before joining with BioNTech to improve the likelihood of identifying the vaccine with the highest potential. To test efficacy, Jansen and Pfizer are working under guidance from the Food and Drug Administration and conducting a 30,000 patient study. In July 2020 Jansen announced positive results in their clinical trials, resulting in an increase in the share price of Pfizer.

== Select publications ==
- Aubry, Jean-Pierre; Pochon, Sibylle; Graber, Pierre; Jansen, Kathrin U.; Bonnefoy, Jean-Yves (1992). "CD21 is a ligand for CD23 and regulates IgE production". Nature. 358 (6386): 505–507. Bibcode:1992Natur.358..505A. doi:10.1038/358505a0. ISSN 1476-4687. PMID 1386409. S2CID 4318355.
- Jansen, Kathrin U.; Rosolowsky, Mark; Schultz, Loren D.; Markus, Henry Z.; Cook, James C.; Donnelly, John J.; Martinez, Douglas; Ellis, Ronald W.; Shaw, Alan R. (1995-01-01). "Vaccination with yeast-expressed cottontail rabbit papillomavirus (CRPV) virus-like particles protects rabbits from CRPV-induced papilloma formation". Vaccine. 13 (16): 1509–1514. doi:10.1016/0264-410X(95)00103-8. ISSN 0264-410X. PMID 8578834.
- Koutsky, Laura A.; Ault, Kevin A.; Wheeler, Cosette M.; Brown, Darron R.; Barr, Eliav; Alvarez, Frances B.; Chiacchierini, Lisa M.; Jansen, Kathrin U. (2002-11-21). "A Controlled Trial of a Human Papillomavirus Type 16 Vaccine". New England Journal of Medicine. 347 (21): 1645–1651. doi:10.1056/NEJMoa020586. ISSN 0028-4793. PMID 12444178.
