= Diane Harper =

American physician-scientist in HPV and cervical cancer prevention

Diane M. Harper
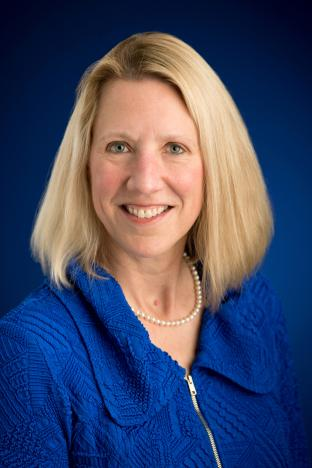
- Education: Massachusetts Institute of Technology (BS 1980; MS 1982); University of Kansas School of Medicine (MD 1986; MPH 1995)
- Known for: Investigations in HPV vaccine trials; contributions to screening and policy; self-sampling to replace the speculum exam for cervical cancer screening
- Awards: EuroGin Distinguished Service Award for Cancer Prevention (2006); Prix Monte-Carlo Femme de l’Année (2013); Society of Teachers of Family Medicine Excellence in Education Award (2013); Curtis G. Hames Lifetime Award for Research (2015); Notre Dame de Sion Outstanding Alumna (2015); Association of American Physicians (elected 2023)
- Scientific career
- Fields: Women's health care; cervical cancer prevention continuum; virology; vaccine development; cancer prevention
- Workplaces: Dartmouth Medical School (1996–2009); University of Missouri–Kansas City (2009–2013); University of Louisville (2013–2017); University of Michigan (2018–present)

Diane M. Harper is an American physician-scientist and tenured professor of Family Medicine, Obstetrics and Gynecology, Bioengineering, and Women's and Gender Studies at the University of Michigan. Her research focuses on human papillomavirus (HPV), cervical cancer prevention, screening methods, and clinical decision-making. She was a site and study investigator in multicenter clinical trials of prophylactic HPV vaccines. Harper has also co-authored studies on therapeutic HPV vaccines, self-sampling for screening, and vaginal microbiome interventions.

Harper's academic appointments include Dartmouth Medical School (clerkship director, residency director, LCME team, Director of the Gynecologic Cancer Prevention Clinics), the University of Missouri–Kansas City (research director, LCME team), the University of Louisville (department chair, LCME team), and the University of Michigan (LCME team; senior associate director, Michigan Institute for Clinical and Healthcare Research). She has served as a member of the U.S. Preventive Services Task Force and as physician director for Community Outreach, Engagement and Health Disparities at the Rogel Cancer Center.

== Early life and education ==
Harper graduated valedictorian from Notre Dame de Sion High School in Kansas City, Missouri. She earned a B.S. in Chemical Engineering from the Massachusetts Institute of Technology in 1980 and an M.S. in 1982, then completed the M.D. (1986) and M.P.H. in Biostatistics & Epidemiology (1995) at the University of Kansas School of Medicine.

== Career ==
Harper has spent her career at the following institutions: Dartmouth Medical School (1996–2009); University of Missouri–Kansas City (2009–2013); University of Louisville, chair of Family & Geriatric Medicine (2013–2017); and University of Michigan (2018–present). She was appointed to the U.S. Preventive Services Task Force in 2016 and joined the U-M Institute for Healthcare Policy & Innovation and the Rogel Cancer Center in 2018. In 2025, she was elected a Fellow of the American Association for the Advancement of Science (AAAS). In a university announcement, Harper described herself as the first family medicine physician-scientist to be elected to the fellowship.

== Research and contributions ==
Harper served as a U.S. investigator in multicenter clinical trials for Cervarix (bivalent L1 virus-like particle HPV vaccine, types 16/18) and Gardasil (quadrivalent L1 virus-like particle HPV vaccine, types 6/11/16/18). In a 2004 Lancet trial, Harper and co-authors reported efficacy against persistent HPV-16/18 infection; a 2006 Lancet follow-up reported sustained efficacy through 4.5 years. In 2007, Harper co-authored a New England Journal of Medicine article reporting quadrivalent vaccine outcomes and contributed to a Bulletin of the World Health Organization review on HPV vaccines. A combined Lancet analysis that year reported efficacy against high-grade vulvar and vaginal HPV-associated lesions.

In 2017, Harper and Leslie DeMars published a review of the first decade of HPV vaccination in Gynecologic Oncology, summarizing trial results and implementation considerations.

In 2019, Harper co-authored a randomized, controlled phase II trial evaluating the therapeutic HPV vaccine tipapkinogen sovacivec for CIN2/3 with 2.5-year follow-up, reporting efficacy and safety outcomes in Gynecologic Oncology.

In 2025, Harper and collaborators reported U.S. studies on self-collected versus clinician-collected samples for HPV detection and genotyping in Preventive Medicine Reports and Cancer Epidemiology, Biomarkers & Prevention; media coverage summarized these findings for general audiences. In parallel, Harper co-authored a study of screening among women with physical disabilities that described barriers associated with speculum-based exams and reported acceptability of at-home self-sampling. Harper also co-authored a randomized, placebo-controlled trial in npj Biofilms and Microbiomes assessing a multi-strain Lactobacillus crispatus–based synbiotic and its effects on the vaginal microbiome.

Materials from the Centers for Disease Control's (CDC) Advisory Committee on Immunization Practices and the World Health Organization provide context for vaccination and screening recommendations that relate to these studies.

== Awards and honors ==
- New Hampshire Family Physician of the Year (2006)
- EuroGin Distinguished Service Award for Cancer Prevention (2006)
- Prix Monte-Carlo Femme de l’Année (2013)
- Society of Teachers of Family Medicine Excellence in Education Award (2013)
- Curtis G. Hames Lifetime Award for Research (2015)
- Notre Dame de Sion Outstanding Alumna (2015)
- Association of American Physicians (elected 2023; noted on U-M profile)
- American Association for the Advancement of Science (AAAS) Fellow (2025)
- Inducted into the Bishop Society of the Teachers of Family Medicine (2026)

== Selected publications ==
- Harper DM, Franco EL, Wheeler CM, et al. Efficacy of a bivalent L1 VLP HPV-16/18 vaccine in young women. The Lancet. 2004;364(9447):1757–1765.
- Harper DM, Franco EL, Wheeler CM, et al. Sustained efficacy up to 4.5 years of a bivalent L1 HPV-16/18 vaccine. The Lancet. 2006;367(9518):1247–1255.
- Harper DM, Nieminen P, Donders G, et al. Tipapkinogen sovacivec therapeutic HPV vaccine for CIN2/3: randomized controlled phase II. Gynecol Oncol. 2019;153(3):521–529.
- Young AP, Olorunfemi M, Morrison L, ... Harper DM. Impact of collection technique on HPV detection & genotyping. Prev Med Rep. 2025;50:102971.
- Harper DM, Young AP, O'Dwyer MC, ... Walline HM. HPV genotyping agreement for two self-collection devices. Cancer Epidemiol Biomarkers Prev. 2025;34(7):1103–1110.
- Ravel J, Simmons S, Jaswa EG, ... Harper DM. L. crispatus synbiotic trial in vaginal microbiome. NPJ Biofilms Microbiomes. 2025;11(1):158.
- Harper DM, DeMars LR. HPV vaccines: review of the first decade. Gynecol Oncol. 2017;146(1):196–204.
