= HPV vaccine =

Class of vaccines against human papillomavirus

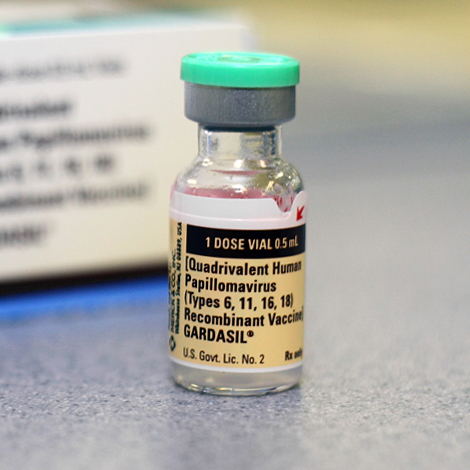

Vaccine description
- Target: Human papillomavirus (HPV)
- Vaccine type: Protein subunit

Clinical data
- Trade names: Gardasil, others
- AHFS/Drugs.com: Monograph
- MedlinePlus: a615028
- License data: US DailyMed: Human papillomavirus vaccine
- Pregnancy category: AU: B2
- Routes of administration: Intramuscular injection
- ATC code: J07BM01 (WHO) J07BM02 (WHO) J07BM03 (WHO)

Legal status
- Legal status: AU: S4 (Prescription only); CA: ℞-only / Schedule D; UK: POM (Prescription only); US: ℞-only; EU: Rx-only

Identifiers
- CAS Number: 910046-32-1
- ChemSpider: none
- KEGG: D10192; D11863

Human papillomavirus (HPV) vaccines are vaccines that prevent infection by certain types of human papillomavirus. They first became available in 2006. Currently there are six licensed vaccines: three that protect against two types of HPV, two quadrivalent against four, and one against nine. All have excellent safety and are highly effective. All protect against HPV types 16 and 18, which are together responsible for approximately 70% of cervical cancer cases globally. The quadrivalent vaccines provide additional protection against HPV types 6 and 11. The nine valent one provides additional protection against HPV types 31, 33, 45, 52 and 58. It is estimated that HPV vaccines may prevent 70% of cervical cancer, 80% of anal cancer, 60% of vaginal cancer, 40% of vulvar cancer, and show more than 90% effectiveness in preventing HPV-positive oropharyngeal cancers. They also protect against penile cancer. They additionally prevent genital warts (also known as anogenital warts), with the quadrivalent and nonavalent vaccines providing virtually complete protection. The World Health Organization (WHO) recommends a one or two-dose schedule for girls aged 9–14 years, the same for girls and women aged 15–20 years, and two doses with a six-month interval for women older than 21 years. The vaccines provide protection for at least five to ten years.

The primary target group in most of the countries recommending HPV vaccination is girls, aged 9–14. The vaccination schedule depends on the age of the vaccine recipient. As of 2025, an estimated 33% of girls aged 9–14 years worldwide received at least one dose (93 countries were implementing the single-dose schedule, 85% of girls aged 9–14 years old vaccinated in that year). At least 162 countries provide the HPV vaccine in their national immunization programs as of 2025. Vaccinating a large portion of the population may also benefit the unvaccinated by way of herd immunity.

The HPV vaccine is on the World Health Organization's List of Essential Medicines. The World Health Organization (WHO) recommends HPV vaccines as part of routine vaccinations in all countries, along with other prevention measures. The WHO's priority purpose of HPV immunization is the prevention of cervical cancer, which accounts for 82% of all HPV-related cancers and more than 95% of which are caused by HPV. Of cervical cancers, 88% (2020 figure) occur and 90% of deaths occur in low- and middle-income countries and 2% (2020 figure) in high-income countries. The WHO-recommended primary target population for HPV vaccination is girls aged 9–14 years before they become sexually active. It aims the introduction of the HPV vaccine in all countries and has set a target of reaching a coverage of 90% of girls fully vaccinated with HPV vaccine by age 15 years. Females aged ≥15 years, boys, older males or men who have sex with men (MSM) are secondary target populations. HPV vaccination is the most cost-effective public health measure against cervical cancer, particularly in resource-constrained settings. Cervical cancer screening is still required following vaccination.

== Medical uses ==
Coverage of the human papillomavirus vaccine

Human papillomavirus vaccine immunization schedule

The WHO recommends a one or two-dose schedule for girls aged 9–14 years, the same for girls and women aged 15–20 years, and two doses with a 6-month interval for women older than 21 years. A one-or-two-dose schedule is also used in boys and men aged 9–20 years, though WHO makes no specific recommendation for males. WHO has prequalified a total of 6 kinds of vaccines. Among these, Cecolin (bivalent), Cervarix, Gardasil (quadrivalent) and Gardasil 9 (nonavalent) are confirmed for use in a single-dose schedule. The remaining vaccine, Walrinvax (bivalent), is only prequalified for two-dose schedule for now (as of October 2024).

The single-dose schedule is a recent (circa 2022) development based on studies on girls and women showing a similar level and duration of protection when taking one dose instead of two. It is a form of off-label use. In 2025, a randomized trial's 5-year extension reported that among Tanzanian girls vaccinated at ages 9–14, ≥99% remained seropositive for HPV-16 and 93–98% for HPV-18 at month 60 after a single dose, while antibody concentrations were stable from months 12–60. Not much is known about the efficacy and protective duration of the simplified schedule in boys and men.

HPV vaccines are used to prevent HPV infection and therefore in particular cervical cancer. Vaccinating females between the ages of nine and thirteen is typically recommended, with many countries also vaccinating males in that age range. In the United States, the Centers for Disease Control and Prevention (CDC) recommends that all 11- to 12-year-olds receive two doses of HPV vaccine, administered 6 to 12 months apart. The vaccines require three doses for those ages 15 and above. Gardasil is a three-dose (injection) vaccine. HPV vaccines are recommended in the United States for women and men who are 9–26 years of age and are also approved for those who are 27–45 years of age.

HPV vaccination of a large percentage of people within a population has been shown to decrease rates of HPV infections, with part of the benefit from herd immunity. Since the vaccines only cover some high-risk types of HPV, cervical cancer screening is recommended even after vaccination. In the US, the recommendation is for women to receive routine Pap smears beginning at age 21. In Australia, the national screening program has changed from the two yearly cytology (pap smears) to being based on tests for HPV DNA, based on work by Karen Canfell and others. As of 2021, the World Health Organization recommends HPV DNA testing as the preferred screening method.

=== Types ===
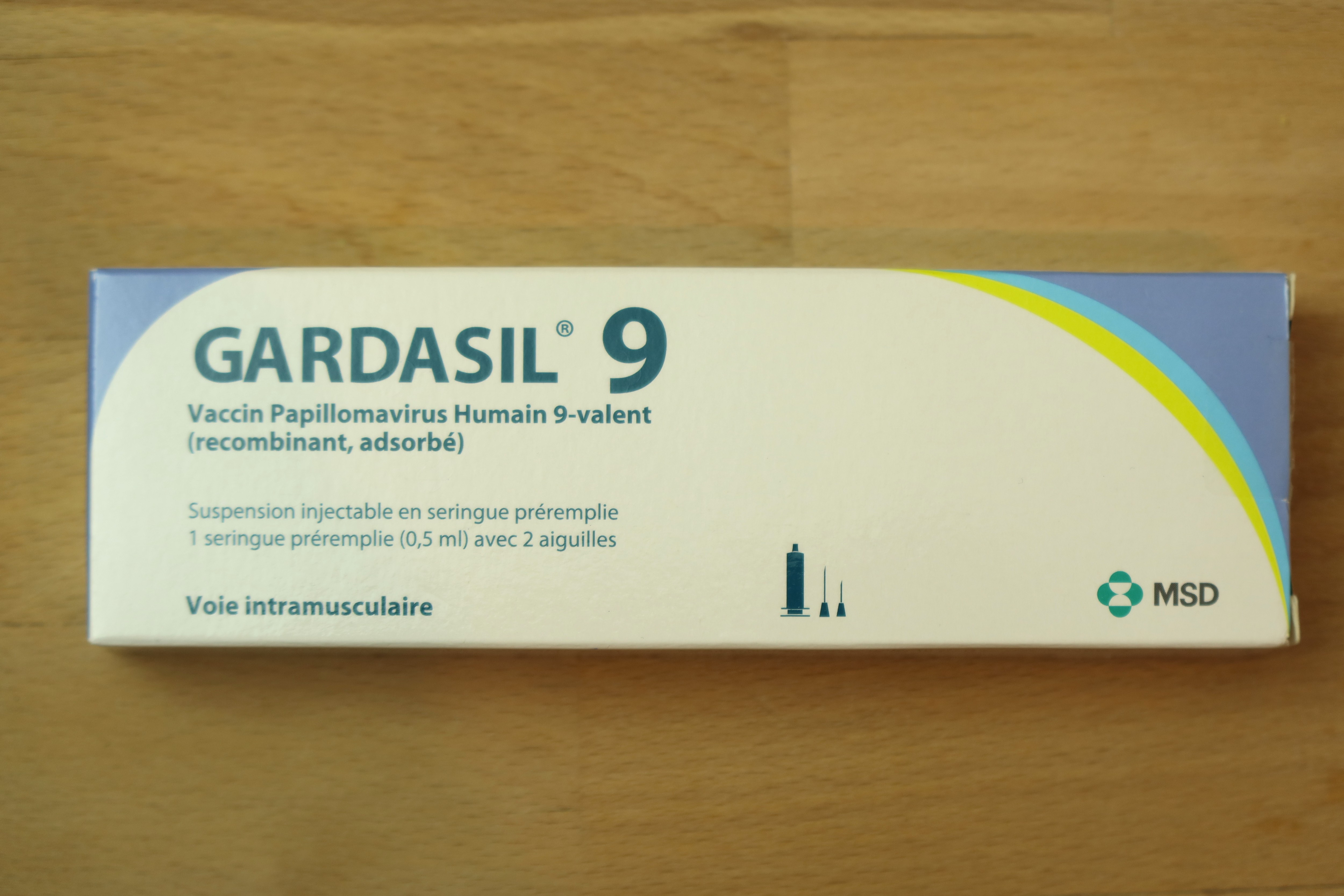
Gardasil 9

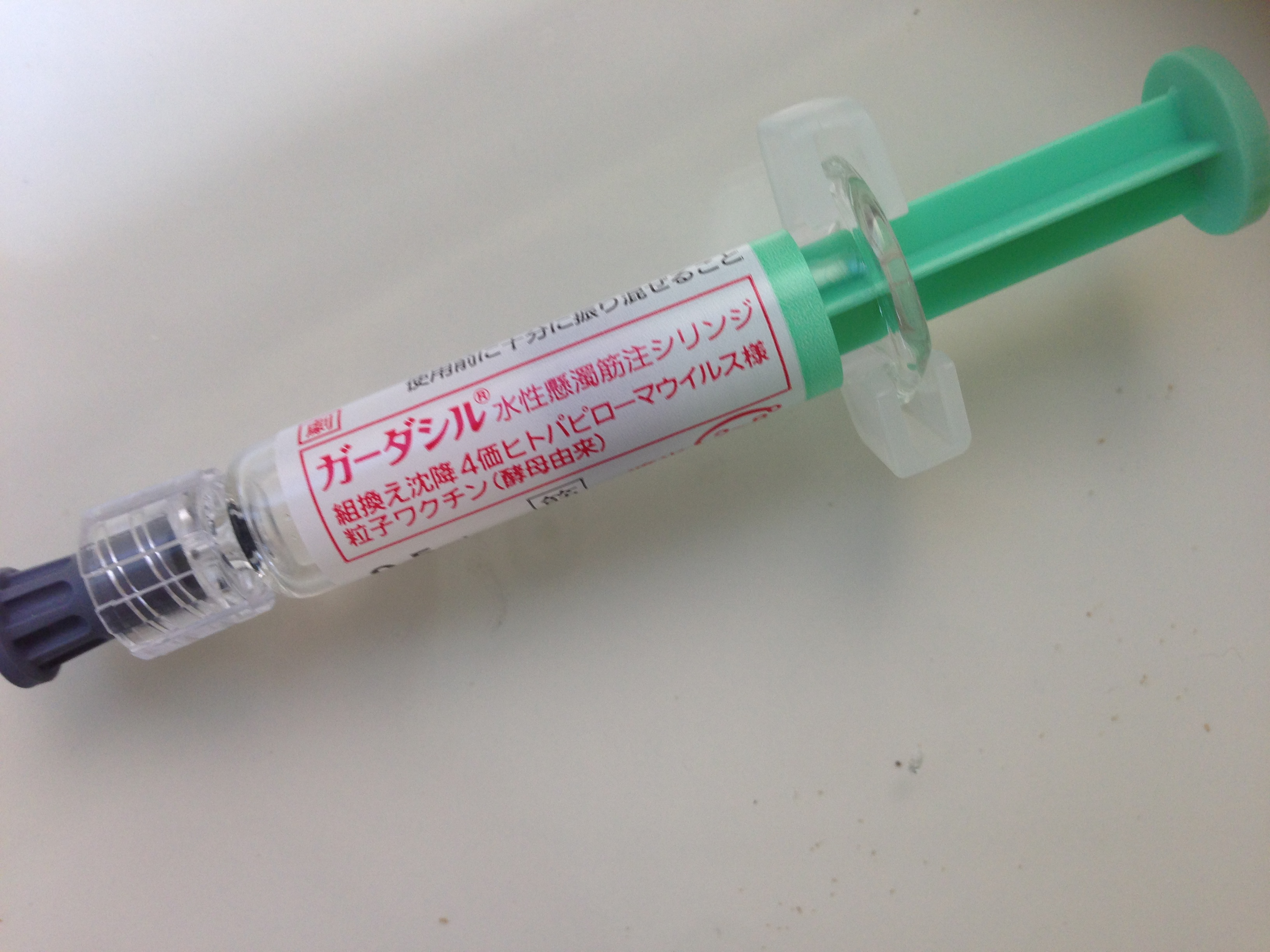
A Gardasil Syringe

All the following vaccines are made of purified proteins arranged in a virus-like particle (VLP) and are given intramuscularly.

==== Bivalent vaccines ====
===== Cervarix =====
Cervarix is manufactured by GlaxoSmithKline Biologicals S.A. (Belgium). It contains VLPs against HPV types 16 and 18 and is licensed for males and females 9 years and older. The vaccine is given in 2 doses six months apart (can be five to thirteen months apart if needed) for people from 9 to 14 years old. In people from 15 years old, it is given in 3 doses with one month between the first and second dose and five months between the second and third dose. Common side-effects include headache, muscle pain, tiredness as well as swelling, redness and pain at the injection site. This vaccine can offer some cross-protection against some HPV viruses other than the types 16 and 18.

===== Cecolin =====
Manufactured by Xiamen Innovax Biotech Co. Ltd. (China). It is effective against HPV types 16 and 18, like Cervarix. It is licensed for administration to girls and women from 9 to 45 years old. In girls up to 14 years old, it is given as 2 doses six months apart. From 15 years old, 3 doses are recommended instead, with one to two months between the first and second dose and five to eight months between the second and third dose.

===== Walrinvax =====
Manufactured by Yuxi Zerun Biotechnology Co., Ltd (China) for girls and women from 9 to 30 years old. It is also effective against HPV types 16 and 18. It is given as 2 doses 6 months apart for girls between 9 and 14 years old (inclusive). For girls and women older than 15 years old, it is then given as 3 doses with two to three months between the first and second dose and six to seven months between the second and third dose.

==== Gardasil ====
Gardasil is manufactured by Merck Sharp & Dohme B.V. (Netherlands). It provides protection against HPV virus types 6, 11, 16 and 18. It is licensed for boys and girls aged 9 and over. It is given as a 2 dose regimen with six months between doses for people from 9 to 14 years old. If the doses must be administered more than six months apart, then a 3rd dose is recommended. In people above 14 years old, it is usually given as a 3 dose regimen with one to two months between the first and second dose and three to four months between the second and third dose.

When Gardasil was first introduced, it was recommended as a prevention for cervical cancer for women 25 years old or younger. Evidence suggests that HPV vaccines are effective in preventing cervical cancer for women up to 45 years of age. Gardasil and Gardasil 9 protect against HPV types 6 and 11 which can cause genital warts, with the quadrivalent and nonavalent vaccines providing virtually complete protection.

===== Silgard =====
Manufactured by Merck Sharp Dohme Ltd (United Kingdom), it was withdrawn by the European Commission by demand of the manufacturer, for commercial reasons, because it was acting as a duplicate for Gardasil.

==== Nine-valent vaccines ====
===== Gardasil 9 =====
Manufactured by Merck Sharp & Dohme B.V. (Netherlands), it is effective against HPV types 6, 11, 16, 18, 31, 33, 45, 52 and 58. It is usually given as a 2 dose regimen, with five to thirteen months between doses, in girls and boys aged 9 to 14. For people above 15 years old, 3 doses are given with one to two months between the first and second dose and three to five months between the second and third doses.

===== Cecolin 9 =====
Manufactured by Xiamen Innovax Biotech Co. Ltd. (China), it offers the same protection as Gardasil 9 (HPV types 6, 11, 16, 18, 31, 33, 45, 52 and 58). It has been accepted for pre qualification review by WHO in June 2026.

=== Efficacy ===
The HPV vaccine has been shown to prevent cervical dysplasia from the high-risk HPV types 16 and 18 and provide some protection against a few closely related high-risk HPV types. However, other high-risk HPV types are not affected by the vaccine. The protection against HPV 16 and 18 has lasted at least eight years after vaccination for Gardasil and more than nine years for Cervarix. It is thought that booster vaccines will not be necessary.

As of September 2024, 57 countries are implementing the single-dose schedule. A growing number of vaccine products initially prequalified for use in a 2-dose schedule can now be used in a single-dose schedule. Before, it was unsure whether two doses of the vaccine may work as well as three doses. The US Centers for Disease Control and Prevention (CDC) recommends two doses in those less than 15 years and three doses in those over 15 years. A single dose might be effective.

A study with 9vHPV, a 9-valent HPV vaccine that protects against HPV types 6, 11, 16, 18, 31, 33, 45, 52, and 58, came to the result that the rate of high-grade cervical, vulvar, or vaginal disease was the same as when using a quadrivalent HPV vaccine. A lack of a difference may have been caused by the study design of including women 16 to 26 years of age, who may largely already have been infected with the five additional HPV types that are additionally covered by the 9-valent vaccine.

Neither Cervarix nor Gardasil prevent other sexually transmitted infections, and they do not treat existing HPV infections or cervical cancer.

==== Adenocarcinoma ====
HPV types 16, 18, and 45 contribute to 94% of cervical adenocarcinoma (cancers originating in the glandular cells of the cervix). While most cervical cancer arises in the squamous cells, adenocarcinomas make up a sizable minority of cancers. Further, Pap smears are not as effective at detecting adenocarcinomas, so where Pap screening programs are in place, a larger proportion of the remaining cancers are adenocarcinomas. Trials suggest that HPV vaccines may also reduce the incidence of adenocarcinoma.

==== United States ====
In 2012, according to the CDC, the use of the HPV vaccine had cut rates of infection with HPV-6, -11, -16, and -18 in half in American teenagers (from 11.5% to 4.3%) and by one-third in American women in their early twenties (from 18.5% to 12.1%).

A combination of improved screening and expanded vaccination had reduced the number of cervical cancer cases by 65% between 2012 and 2019. At the same time, improved treatment also reduced mortality rates in those who did get cervical cancer.

=== Males ===
As of 2022, 47 countries (24% of WHO member states) have introduced HPV vaccine in their national immunization programme for boys. For instance, it is the case in Switzerland, Portugal, Canada, Australia, Ireland, South Korea, Hong Kong, the United Kingdom, New Zealand, the Netherlands, and the United States.

In males also, Gardasil and Gardasil 9 protect against HPV types 6 and 11 which can cause genital warts, with the quadrivalent and nonavalent vaccines providing virtually complete protection. They reduce their risk of precancerous lesions caused by HPV. This reduction in precancerous lesions is predicted to reduce the rates of penile and anal cancer in men. Gardasil has been shown to also be effective in preventing high-risk HPV types 16 and 18 in males. While Gardasil and the Gardasil 9 vaccines have been approved for males, a third HPV vaccine, Cervarix, has not. Unlike the Gardasil-based vaccines, Cervarix does not protect against genital warts.

From a public health point of view, vaccinating men as well as women (GNV, or Gender Neutral Vaccination) decreases the virus pool within the population. Whether this is cost-effective depends on a number of assumptions: (a) cost of the vaccine, (b) assumed duration of immunity, (c) whether diseases other than cervical cancer are considered, and (d) the assumed discount rate, for the cost of a vaccine is current but the cost of disease avoided is in the far future. A literature review in 2025 looked at studies of this questions. A majority of the studies concluded GNV was cost-effective, except perhaps in countries such as Great Britain and New Zealand that had very high female coverage.

Gardasil is also used among men who have sex with men (MSM), who are at higher risk for genital warts, penile cancer, and anal cancer.

== Recommendations ==
=== Males ===
==== Australia ====
Australia introduced HPV vaccination for boys in 2013.

==== Ireland ====
Ireland introduced HPV vaccination for boys aged 13 as part of their National Immunization Plan in 2019.

==== UK ====
UK introduced HPV vaccination for boys aged 12 as part of their National Immunization Plan in 2019.

==== Portugal ====
Portugal introduced universal HPV vaccination for boys aged 10 years and above as part of its National Immunization Plan in 2020.

==== Japan ====
In October 2025, a coalition of 32 academic societies—including the Japan Pediatric Society, the Japanese Society of Obstetrics and Gynaecology, and the Japanese Association of Infectious Diseases—submitted a formal request to the Ministry of Health, Labour and Welfare calling for the introduction of routine HPV vaccination for males.

Despite this, the ministry's advisory subcommittee has twice raised concerns over cost-effectiveness, in March 2024 and September 2025, and as of late 2025 routine vaccination for males has not been approved.

==== United States ====
On 9 September 2009, an advisory panel recommended that the Food and Drug Administration (FDA) of the USA license Gardasil in the United States for boys and men ages 9–26 for the prevention of genital warts. Soon after that, the vaccine was approved by the FDA for use in males aged 9 to 26 for prevention of genital warts and anal cancer.

In 2011, an advisory panel for the US Centers for Disease Control and Prevention (CDC) recommended the vaccine for boys ages 11–12. This was intended to prevent genital warts and anal cancers in males, and possibly prevent head and neck cancer (though the vaccine's effectiveness against head and neck cancers has not yet been proven). The committee also made the vaccination recommendation for males 13 to 21 years who have not been vaccinated previously or who have not completed the three-dose series. For those under the age of 27 who have not been fully vaccinated the CDC recommends vaccination.

Also in 2011, Harald zur Hausen's support for vaccinating boys (so that they will be protected, and thereby so will women) was joined by professors Harald Moi and Ole-Erik Iversen.

In 2018, the US Food and Drug Administration (FDA) released a summary basis for regulatory action and approval for expansion of usage and indication for Gardasil 9, the 9-valent HPV vaccine, to include men and women 27 to 45 years of age.

=== Sweden ===
Boys born 2009 and later as well as girls born 2009 and later are offerd free HPV vaccines at school as a part of the national vaccination program. The vaccine is recommended for all adults until under 26.

=== World Health Organization ===
The HPV vaccine is on the WHO Model List of Essential Medicines. The WHO recommends HPV vaccines as part of routine vaccinations in all countries, along with other prevention measures. The WHO's priority purpose of HPV immunization is the prevention of cervical cancer, which accounts for 82% of all HPV-related cancers and more than 95% of which are caused by HPV. The WHO has a global strategy for cervical cancer elimination. Its first pillar is having 90% of girls fully vaccinated with the HPV vaccine by 15 years of age. The WHO-recommended primary target population for HPV vaccination is girls aged 9–14 years before they become sexually active. Females aged ≥15 years, boys, older males or MSM are secondary target populations. Cervical cancer screening is still required following vaccination.

== Side effects ==
HPV vaccines are safe and well tolerated and can be used in persons who are immunocompromised or HIV-infected. Pain at the site of injection occurs in between 35% and 88% of people Redness and swelling at the site and fever may also occur. No link to Guillain–Barré syndrome has been found. There is no increased risk of serious adverse effects. Extensive clinical trial and post-marketing safety surveillance data indicate that both Gardasil and Cervarix are well tolerated and safe. When comparing the HPV vaccine to a placebo (control) vaccine taken by women, there is no difference in the risk of severe adverse events.

=== United States ===
As of 8 September 2013, there were more than 57 million doses of Gardasil vaccine distributed in the United States, though it is unknown how many were administered. There have been 22,000 Vaccine Adverse Event Reporting System (VAERS) reports following the vaccination. 92% were reports of events considered to be non-serious (e.g., fainting, pain, and swelling at the injection site (arm), headache, nausea, and fever), and the rest were considered to be serious (death, permanent disability, life-threatening illness, and hospitalization). However, VAERS reports include any reported effects whether coincidental or causal. In response to concerns regarding the rates of adverse events associated with the vaccine, the CDC stated: "When evaluating data from VAERS, it is important to note that for any reported event, no cause-and-effect relationship has been established. VAERS receives reports on all potential associations between vaccines and adverse events."

As of 1 September 2009, in the US there were 44 reports of death in females after receiving the vaccine. None of the 27 confirmed deaths of women and girls who had taken the vaccine were linked to the vaccine. There is no evidence suggesting that Gardasil causes or raises the risk of Guillain–Barré syndrome. Additionally, there have been rare reports of blood clots forming in the heart, lungs, and legs. A 2015 review conducted by the European Medicines Agency's Pharmacovigilance Risk Assessment Committee concluded that evidence does not support the idea that HPV vaccination causes complex regional pain syndrome or postural orthostatic tachycardia syndrome.

As of 8 September 2013, the CDC continued to recommend Gardasil vaccination for the prevention of four types of HPV. The manufacturer of Gardasil has committed to ongoing research assessing the vaccine's safety.

According to the Centers for Disease Control and Prevention (CDC) and the FDA, the rate of adverse side effects related to Gardasil immunization in the safety review was consistent with what has been seen in the safety studies carried out before the vaccine was approved and were similar to those seen with other vaccines. However, a higher proportion of syncope (fainting) was seen with Gardasil than is usually seen with other vaccines. The FDA and CDC have reminded healthcare providers that, to prevent falls and injuries, all vaccine recipients should remain seated or lying down and be closely observed for 15 minutes after vaccination. The HPV vaccination does not appear to reduce the willingness of women to undergo pap tests.

=== Contraindications ===
While the use of HPV vaccines can help reduce cervical cancer deaths by two-thirds around the world, not everyone is eligible for vaccination. Some factors exclude people from receiving HPV vaccines. These factors include:

- People with history of immediate hypersensitivity to vaccine components. Patients with a hypersensitivity to yeast should not receive Gardasil since yeast is used in its production.
- People with moderate or severe acute illnesses. This does not completely exclude patients from vaccination but postpones the time of vaccination until the illness has improved.

=== Pregnancy ===
In the Gardasil clinical trials, 1,115 pregnant women received the HPV vaccine. Overall, the proportions of pregnancies with an adverse outcome were comparable in subjects who received Gardasil and subjects who received a placebo. However, the clinical trials had a relatively small sample size. As of 2018, the vaccine is not recommended for pregnant women.

The FDA has classified the HPV vaccine as a pregnancy Category B, meaning there is no apparent harm to the fetus in animal studies. HPV vaccines have not been causally related to adverse pregnancy outcomes or adverse effects on the fetus. However, data on vaccination during pregnancy is very limited, and vaccination during the pregnancy term should be delayed until more information is available. If a woman is found to be pregnant during the three-dose series of vaccination, the series should be postponed until pregnancy has been completed. While there is no indication for intervention for vaccine dosages administered during pregnancy, patients and healthcare providers are encouraged to report exposure to vaccines to the appropriate HPV vaccine pregnancy registry.

=== Fertility ===
Concerns have been raised about whether HPV vaccination could affect fertility. After reviewing case reports, safety surveillance data, and epidemiological studies, the World Health Organization's Global Advisory Committee on Vaccine Safety concluded that the available evidence does not support a causal association between HPV vaccination and either infertility or primary ovarian insufficiency.

== Cervical cancer ==
The large majority of cervical cancer cases in 2020 (88%) occurred in LMICs, where they account for 17% of all cancers in women, compared with only 2% in high-income countries (HICs). In sub-Saharan Africa, the region with the highest rates of young WLWH (Women Living With HIV), approximately 20% of cervical cancer cases occur in WLWH [women living with HIV]. HPV infection is more likely to persist and to progress to cancer in WLWH.33 Mortality rates vary 50-fold between countries, ranging from <2 per 100 000 women in some HICs to >40 per 100 000 in some countries of sub-Saharan Africa.

Of the 20 hardest hit countries by cervical cancer, 19 are in Africa.

The US National Cancer Institute states "Widespread vaccination has the potential to reduce cervical cancer deaths around the world by as much as two-thirds if all women were to take the vaccine and if protection turns out to be long-term. In addition, the vaccines can reduce the need for medical care, biopsies, and invasive procedures associated with the follow-up from abnormal Pap tests, thus helping to reduce health care costs and anxieties related to abnormal Pap tests and follow-up procedures."

In 2004, preventive vaccines already protected against the two HPV types (16 and 18) that cause about 70% of cervical cancers worldwide. Because of the distribution of HPV types associated with cervical cancer, the vaccines were likely to be most effective in Asia, Europe, and North America. Some other high-risk types cause a larger percentage of cancers in other parts of the world. Vaccines that protect against more of the types common in cancers would prevent more cancers, and be less subject to regional variation. For instance, a vaccine against the seven types most common in cervical cancers (16, 18, 45, 31, 33, 52, 58) would prevent an estimated 87% of cervical cancers worldwide.

In 2008, only 41% of women with cervical cancer in the developing world got medical treatment. Therefore, prevention of HPV by vaccination may be a more effective way of lowering the disease burden in developing countries than cervical screening. The European Society of Gynecological Oncology sees the developing world as most likely to benefit from HPV vaccination. However, individuals in many resource-limited nations, Kenya for example, are unable to afford the vaccine.

In 2025, Nepal launched a nationwide human papillomavirus (HPV) vaccination campaign aimed at eliminating cervical cancer. Supported by the World Health Organization, UNICEF, and Gavi, the Vaccine Alliance, the initiative targets more than 1.6 million girls aged 10 to 15 years. The campaign addresses a major health concern in Nepal, where hundreds of women are diagnosed with the virus-caused disease each year and aims to eliminate cervical cancer by 2030.

In more developed countries, populations that do not receive adequate medical care, such as the poor or minorities in the United States or parts of Europe also have less access to cervical screening and appropriate treatment, and are similarly more likely to benefit. In 2009, Dr. Diane Harper, a researcher for the HPV vaccines, questioned whether the benefits of the vaccine outweigh its risks in countries where Pap smear screening is common. She has also encouraged women to continue pap screening after they are vaccinated and to be aware of potential adverse effects.

== Mechanism of action ==
The HPV vaccines are based on hollow virus-like particles (VLPs) assembled from recombinant HPV coat proteins. The natural virus capsid is composed of two proteins, L1 and L2, but vaccines only contain L1.

Gardasil contains inactive L1 proteins from four different HPV strains: 6, 11, 16, and 18, synthesized in the yeast Saccharomyces cerevisiae. Each vaccine dose contains 225 μg of aluminum, 9.56 mg of sodium chloride, 0.78 mg of L-histidine, 50 μg of polysorbate 80, 35 μg of sodium borate, and water. The combination of ingredients totals 0.5 mL. HPV types 16 and 18 cause about 70% of all cervical cancer. Gardasil also targets HPV types 6 and 11, which together cause about 90 percent of all cases of genital warts.

Gardasil and Cervarix are designed to elicit virus-neutralizing antibody responses that prevent initial infection with the HPV types represented in the vaccine. The vaccines have been shown to offer 100 percent protection against the development of cervical pre-cancers and genital warts caused by the HPV types in the vaccine, with few or no side effects. The protective effects of the vaccine are expected to last a minimum of 4.5 years after the initial vaccination.

While the study period was not long enough for cervical cancer to develop, the prevention of these cervical precancerous lesions (or dysplasias) is believed highly likely to result in the prevention of those cancers.

== History ==
Harald zur Hausen first suspected that papillomaviruses had a cancer-virus connection after reading a 1967 article in Bacteriological Review that described cases of warts that turned malignant. At the time, many virologists incorrectly suspected that cervical cancer was caused by herpes simplex virus 2, based on the known epidemiological link between cervical cancer and sexual activity. Zur Hausen began working on HPV's possible link with cervical cancer in 1972, after accepting an offer to establish a center for clinical virology at the University of Erlangen–Nuremberg. After 1977, he and his team continued his research as chair of the Institute of Hygiene at the University of Freiburg. Members of zur Hausen's team, virologist Lutz Gissmann and PhD student Matthais Dürst, detected the DNA sequence for novel variants of HPV (HPV11, HPV16, and HPV18) in cervical cancer specimens; they published their results in 1983. This provided strong scientific evidence for a link between the viral infection and cervical cancer, and provided strong motivations for further research into HPVs.

In 1990, Ian Frazer partnered with Jian Zhou and Xiao-Yi Sun at the University of Queensland in Australia to create synthetic HPVs for study in the lab. While working towards this goal, they were able to synthetically produce some of the capsid proteins of the HPVs, L1 and L2. Recognizing the potential of these proteins to form the basis of a vaccine, they filed a provisional patent on their production process in Australia in 1991.

The further invention then stalled while convincing developers of the market for the vaccine, and also while patent offices determined who the discovery belonged to. Three other organizations, the US National Cancer Institute, Georgetown University, and University of Rochester, were also vying for the patent as a result of contributions in the space. After providing evidence of the correctness of their L1 sequencing in 2004, the US patent court of appeals accorded priority to the University of Queensland in 2009. As a result, the University of Queensland receives royalty payments from the sale of these vaccines even today.

By the early 2000s, developers, convinced of the market of the vaccine, had begun refining, researching, and trialing L1-based HPV vaccines. In 2006, the FDA approved the first preventive HPV vaccine, marketed by Merck & Co. under the trade name Gardasil. According to a Merck press release, by the second quarter of 2007 it had been approved in 80 countries, many under fast-track or expedited review. Early in 2007, GlaxoSmithKline filed for approval in the United States for a similar preventive HPV vaccine, known as Cervarix. In June 2007, this vaccine was licensed in Australia, and it was approved in the European Union in September 2007. Cervarix was approved for use in the US in October 2009.

Harald zur Hausen was awarded half of the $1.4 million Nobel Prize in Medicine in 2008 for his work showing that cervical cancer is caused by certain types of HPVs.

In December 2014, the US Food and Drug Administration (FDA) approved a vaccine called Gardasil 9 to protect females between the ages of 9 and 26 and males between the ages of 9 and 15 against nine strains of HPV. Gardasil 9 protects against infection from the strains covered by the first generation of Gardasil (HPV-6, HPV-11, HPV-16, and HPV-18) and protects against five other HPV strains responsible for 20% of cervical cancers (HPV-31, HPV-33, HPV-45, HPV-52, and HPV-58).

== Society and culture ==
=== Economics ===
As of 2013, vaccinating girls and young women was estimated to be cost-effective in the low and middle-income countries, especially in places without organized programs for screening cervical cancer. When the cost of the vaccine itself, or the cost of administering it to individuals, were higher, or if cervical cancer screening were readily available, then vaccination was less likely to be cost-effective.

From a public health point of view, vaccinating men as well as women (GNV, or Gender Neutral Vaccination) decreases the virus pool within the population. Whether this is cost-effective depends on a number of assumptions: (a) cost of the vaccine, (b) assumed duration of immunity, (c) whether diseases other than cervical cancer are considered, and (d) the assumed discount rate, for the cost of a vaccine is current but the cost of disease avoided is in the far future. A literature review in 2025 looked at studies of this questions. A majority of the studies concluded GNV was cost-effective, except perhaps in countries such as Great Britain and New Zealand that had very high female coverage.

In 2013, the two companies that sell the most common vaccines announced a price cut to less than US$5 per dose to poor countries, as opposed to US$130 per dose in the US.

=== Brand names ===
The vaccine is sold under various brand names including Gardasil, Cervarix, Cecolin, and Walrinvax.

=== Vaccine implementation ===
The primary target group in most of the countries recommending HPV vaccination is young adolescent girls, aged 9–14. It's particularly cost-effective in resource-constrained settings. The vaccination schedule depends on the age of the vaccine recipient. As of 2023, 27% of girls aged 9–14 years worldwide received at least one dose (37 countries were implementing the single-dose schedule). Global coverage for the first dose of HPV vaccine in girls grew from 20% in 2022 to 27% in 2023. As of 10 September 2024, 57 countries are implementing the single-dose schedule. Vaccinating a large portion of the population may also benefit the unvaccinated by way of herd immunity.

HPV vaccine introductions have been hampered by global supply shortages since 2018. Between 2019 and 2021, due to the COVID-19 pandemic, HPV vaccination programs have been significantly affected in the United States, low-income and lower-middle-income countries.

In developed countries, the widespread use of cervical "Pap smear" screening programs has reduced the incidence of invasive cervical cancer by 50% or more. Preventive vaccines reduce but do not eliminate the chance of getting cervical cancer. Therefore, experts recommend that women combine the benefits of both programs by seeking regular Pap smear screening, even after vaccination. School-entry vaccination requirements were found to increase the use of the HPV vaccine.

==== HPV vaccine included in national immunization program ====
At least 144 countries (at least 74% of WHO member states) provided the HPV vaccine in their national immunization schedule for girls, as of November 2024. As of 2022, 47 countries (24% of WHO member states) also did it for boys.

===== Africa =====
Of the 20 hardest hit countries by cervical cancer, 19 are in Africa. In 2013, with support from Gavi, the Vaccine Alliance, eight low-income countries, mainly in sub-Saharan Africa, began the rollout of the HPV vaccine.

====== Algeria ======
No

====== Angola ======
No

====== Chad ======
No

====== Central African Republic ======
No

====== Democratic Republic of Congo ======
No

====== Ghana ======
No (GAVI support in 2013)

====== Guinea-Bissau ======
No

====== Kenya ======
Both Cervarix and Gardasil are approved for use within Kenya by the Pharmacy and Poisons Board. However, at a cost of 20,000 Kenyan shillings, which is more than the average annual income for a family, the director of health promotion in the Ministry of Health, Nicholas Muraguri, states that many Kenyans are unable to afford the vaccine. It has received GAVI support in 2013.

====== Madagascar ======
No (GAVI support in 2013)

====== Malawi ======
Yes (GAVI support in 2013)

====== Mozambique ======
Yes (GAVI support for HPV demonstration projects in 2014)

====== Niger ======
No (GAVI support in 2013)

====== Nigeria ======
In 2020 an estimated 12,100 patients and 8000 deaths due to cervical cancer in Nigeria, their by becoming the second leading cause of femal cancer mortality and morbidity after breast cancer. At this time is also estimated that 60,9 million nigerian women age 15 and old are at great risk of developing cervical cancer if no cost-effect stratgies are put in place to prevent and detect cevrical cancer. Too combat cervical cancer and reduced the risk of devloping it vacination of HPV in adolescent girls before sexual activity is the most effective long term intervention. In June 2020 a 107 of 194 WHO member hade partially of fully introduce HVP vaccines but LMICs still lag behind and only achived a 41% coverge at 2019. To combat this and implemnet vaccination programs Nigeria has hade two strategic document, the National Strategic Plan on Prevention and Control of Cervical Caner in Nigeria 2017-20210 and the National Cancer Control Plan 2018 to 2022 which had set up a roadmap for Nigeria Vision for cancer prevention including HPV vaccination. the goals include giving 4,5 million girls age 9 to 13 vaccination over a 5 year period costing 18 million dollars and attain 90% HPV vaccine coverage of girls aged 9 to 13 by 2022. Sadly these goal were not achieved, but as of 2023 Nigeria has introduced the vaccine as part of it routine immunization system aiming to reach 7.7 million girls and they have stated that Nigeria has met the condition for support from Gavi and preparation has been made to roll out a new vaccination programme by 2024. Yes

====== Rwanda ======
Rwanda became the first country in Africa to initiate a national vaccine program against human papillomavirus. The goal of the program was to protect as many girls as possible aged 15 and under. After they performed a catch-up campaign in school, they transitioned to routine vaccination of 12-year-old girls. They have now achieved coverage rates >90% through their school population They financed it through support from Gavi (support i 2014) public and private partnerships.

====== Senegal ======
Yes

====== Sierra Leone ======
Yes (GAVI support in 2013)

==== South Africa ====
Cervical cancer represents the most common cause of cancer-related deaths—more than 3,000 deaths per year—among women in South Africa because of high HIV prevalence, making the introduction of the vaccine highly desirable. A Papanicolaou test program was established in 2000 to help screen for cervical cancer, but since this program has not been implemented widely, vaccination would offer more efficient form of prevention. In May 2013 the Minister of Health of South Africa, Aaron Motsoaledi, announced the government would provide free HPV vaccines for girls aged 9 and 10 in the poorest 80% of schools starting in February 2014 and the fifth quintile later on. South Africa became the first African country with an immunisation schedule that includes vaccines to protect people from HPV infection, but because the effectiveness of the vaccines in women who later become infected with HIV is not yet fully understood, it is difficult to assess how cost-effective the vaccine will be. The South African Department of Health successfully negotiated with GlaxoSmithKline to obtain a lower price for Cervarix, at 157 South African Rand per dose, significantly less than the market price but about three times higher than the price paid by Gavi for low-income countries.

===== United Republic of Tanzania =====
Yes (GAVI support in 2013)

===== Zimbabwe =====
Yes (GAVI support for HPV demonstration projects in 2014)

===== Australia =====
In April 2007, Australia became the first country to introduce a government-funded National Human Papillomavirus (HPV) Vaccination Program to protect young women against HPV infections that can lead to cancers and disease. The National HPV Vaccination Program is listed on the National Immunisation Program (NIP) Schedule and funded under the Immunise Australia Program. The Immunise Australia Program is a joint Federal, State, and Territory Government initiative to increase immunisation rates for vaccine-preventable diseases.

The National HPV Vaccination Program for females was made up of two components: an ongoing school-based program for 12- and 13-year-old girls; and a time-limited catch-up program (females aged 14–26 years) delivered through schools, general practices, and community immunization services, which ceased on 31 December 2009.

During 2007–2009, an estimated 83% of females aged 12–17 years received at least one dose of HPV vaccine and 70% completed the 3-dose HPV vaccination course. By 2017, HPV coverage data on the Immunise Australia website show that by 15 years of age, over 82% of Australian females had received all three doses.

Since the National HPV Vaccination Program commenced in 2007, there has been a reduction in HPV-related infections in young women. A study published in The Journal of Infectious Diseases in October 2012 found the prevalence of vaccine-preventable HPV types (6, 11, 16, and 18) in Papanicolaou test results of women aged 18–24 years has significantly decreased from 28.7% to 6.7% four years after the introduction of the National HPV Vaccination Program. A 2011 report published found the diagnosis of genital warts (caused by HPV types 6 and 11) had also decreased in young women and men.

In October 2010, the Australian regulatory agency, the Therapeutic Goods Administration, extended the registration of the quadrivalent vaccine (Gardasil) to include use in males aged 9 through 26 years of age, for the prevention of external genital lesions and infection with HPV types 6, 11, 16 and 18.

In November 2011, the Pharmaceutical Benefits Advisory Committee (PBAC) recommended the extension of the National HPV Vaccination Program to include males. The PBAC made its recommendation on the preventive health benefits that can be achieved, such as a reduction in the incidence of anal and penile cancers and other HPV-related diseases. In addition to the direct benefit to males, it was estimated that routine HPV vaccination of adolescent males would contribute to the reduction of vaccine HPV-type infection and associated disease in women through herd immunity.

In 2012, the Australian Government announced it would be extending the National HPV Vaccination Program to include males, through the National Immunisation Program Schedule.

Updated results were reported in 2014.

Since February 2013, free HPV vaccine has been provided through school-based programs for:

- males and females aged 12–13 years (ongoing program); and
- males aged between 14 and 15 years – until the end of the school year in 2014 (catch-up program).

===== Canada =====
HPV vaccines were first approved in Canada in July 2006 for use in females, and February 2010 for use in males.

The vaccines Cervarix, Gardasil, and Gardasil 9 are authorized for use in Canada, with Gardasil 9 the primary vaccine used. All provinces and territories (except Quebec) administer Gardasil 9 on a two or three-dose schedule: individuals under age 15 are given two doses, while individuals who are immunocompromised, living with HIV, or age 15+ are given three doses. Quebec provides two doses to individuals under 18 years (the first dose is Gardasil 9, and the second dose is Cervarix) and three doses of Gardasil 9 to people age 18+.

The administration of free vaccination programs is provided by individual province and territory governments. All provincial and territorial governments offer free vaccination for school-aged children, irrespective of gender. The school grades in which the vaccine is provided varies by province and territory: grade 4 and secondary 3 (Quebec); grade 6 (British Columbia, Manitoba, Newfoundland and Labrador, Nunavut, Prince Edward Island, Saskatchewan, Yukon); grades 6 and 9 (Alberta); grades 4-6 (Northwest Territories); or grade 7 (New Brunswick, Nova Scotia, Ontario). Publicly funded HPV vaccines are also provided in certain provinces and territories for other groups of people, such as men who have sex with men, individuals living with HIV, and individuals who identify as transgender. Individuals who do not qualify for any of the publicly funded programs can privately purchase the three-dose HPV vaccine series for $510 to $630.

===== China =====
GlaxoSmithKline China announced in 2016, that Cervarix (HPV vaccine 16 and 18) had been approved by the China Food and Drug Administration (CFDA). Cervarix is registered in China for girls aged 9 to 45, adopting 3-dose program within 6 months. Cervarix was launched in China in 2017, and it was the first approved HPV vaccine in China.

China has since developed two HPV vaccines of its own: Cecolin (licensed in China in 2019) and Walrinvax (licensed in China in 2022).

===== Colombia =====
The vaccine was introduced in 2012. The HPV vaccine was initially offered to girls aged 9 and older, and attending the fourth grade of school. Since 2013 the age of coverage was extended to girls in school from grade four (who have reached the age of 9) to grade eleven (independent of age); and no schooling from age 9–17 years 11 months and 29 days old.

===== Costa Rica =====
Since June 2019, the vaccine has been administered compulsorily by the state, free of charge to girls at ten years of age.

===== Europe =====
As of 2020, the European Centre for Disease Prevention and Control (ECDC) reports that the vaccine uptake among females is the following:

Finland, Hungary, Iceland, Malta, Norway, Portugal, Spain, Sweden, and the UK have reported national coverage above 70%. In some countries, including France and Germany, coverage has been consistently below 50%, though recently increasing in France.

Country	Date of introduction	Gender(s)	Target age group	Financed by	Policy
Austria	2006	M/F	10–12	Fully financed by national health authorities for everyone age 9 to 20 years	Voluntary immunization
Belgium	2007	M/F	10–13	Fully financed by national health authorities	Mandatory; part of the national immunization schedule
Croatia	20 May 2016	M/F	12	Fully financed by national health authorities	Voluntary immunization for women not yet sexually active
Czech Republic		M/F			
Denmark	1 January 2009	M/F	12	Fully financed by national health authorities	Part of the Danish Childhood Vaccination program
Finland	21 November 2013 for female, 20 May 2020 for male	M/F	11–12	Fully financed by national health authorities	Part of the Finnish National Vaccination program
France	11 July 2007	F	14–23	Financed 65% by national health authorities	Voluntary immunization for women not yet sexually active
Germany	26 March 2007	M/F	9–14	Fully financed by mandatory health insurance	Voluntary immunization
Greece	12 February 2007	F	12–26	Fully financed by national health authorities	Mandatory for all girls entering 7th grade
Hungary	September 2014 for females and 2020 for males	M/F	12-13	Fully financed by national health authorities for 7th grade schoolgirls (12–13 years old). Several local governments have decided to pursue their own earlier initiative, thus providing the vaccine to those who are not eligible for the national vaccination programme due to their age. Subsidised by some local councils for 13- and 14-year-olds.	Public vaccination program
Iceland	2011		12	Fully financed by national health authorities	
Ireland	2009	M/F	12–13	Fully financed by national health authorities	Offered to males and females in the first year of secondary school. Non-mandatory. HPV vaccination was introduced to the national immunisation scheme for males in 2019.
Italy	26 March 2007	M/F	12	Fully financed by national health authorities initially for girls only. Offered to boys from 2017.	
Latvia	2009		12	Fully financed by national health authorities	
Liechtenstein		M/F			
Luxembourg	2008		12	Fully financed by national health authorities	
Netherlands	2009	M/F	10-18	Fully financed by national health authorities. Offered to boys starting from February 2022	
North Macedonia	2009	F	12	Fully financed by national health authorities	Mandatory; part of the national immunization schedule
Norway	2009	M/F	12–13		Part of the national immunization program
Portugal	2007	F	13	Fully financed by national health authorities	Part of the national immunization program for both boys and girls
Romania	November 2008	F	10-18	Fully financed by national health authorities	Part of the national immunization program, but not mandatory for 10–14 years old girls until August 2021, up to 18 years old as of 3 September 2021
Slovenia	2009		11–12	Fully financed by national health authorities	
Spain	2007		11–14	Fully financed by national health authorities	
Sweden	2012	M/F	10–11	The school-based vaccination program is fully financed by national health authorities, initially for girls only. Offered to all children in fifth grade from August 2020 (boys born in 2009 are included).	All vaccinations within the national vaccination programme for children are voluntary.
Switzerland	2008		11–14	Fully financed by national health authorities	
UK	September 2008	M/F	M: 9–45 F: 9–45	Fully financed by national health authorities initially for girls only. Offered to boys aged 12 and 13 years from September 2019. The HPV vaccine is available for free on the NHS up until a person's 25th birthday if they were eligible and missed the HPV vaccine offered in Year 8 at school: girls born after 1 September 1991; boys born after 1 September 2006; Also fully financed by national health authorities since 2018 for men aged up to and including 45 years of age who have sex with other men (MSM) when they visit sexual health clinics and HIV clinics in England. Trans women (people who were assigned male at birth) are eligible in the same way as MSM if their risk of getting HPV is similar to the risk of MSM who are eligible for the HPV vaccine. Trans men (people who were assigned female at birth) are eligible if they have sex with other men and are aged 45 or under.	Offered to males and females in the second year of secondary school, as well as at sexual health and HIV clinics in England. Non-mandatory.

==== Hong Kong ====
HPV vaccines are approved for use in Hong Kong. As part of the Hong Kong Childhood Immunisation Programme, HPV vaccines became mandatory for students in the 2019/2020 school year, exclusively for females at primary 5 and 6 levels.

===== India =====
HPV vaccine (both Gardasil and Cervarix) was introduced in Indian markets in 2008, and has been included in country's universal immunization programme as of 2026. In Punjab and Sikkim (states of India), it is included in the state immunization program and the coverage is up to 97% of targeted girls. HPV vaccination has been recommended by the National Technical Advisory Group on Immunization, but has not been implemented in India as of 2018.

In 2023, Serum Institute of India (SII) developed a new vaccine Cervavax targeting HPV types 6, 11, 16, and 18. The newly developed vaccine shows equal capability to Merck's Gardasil 9. Cervavax vaccine isn't commercially available yet. In 2024, the HPV vaccine drive was announced by Finance Minister Nirmala Sitharaman as part of Nari Shakti ("Women Power") campaign but hasn't been implemented yet. The vaccine is commercially available in the market at a price between ₹ 3,000 ($35) and ₹ 15,000 ($180).

In 2026, the Government of India launched a nationwide vaccination campaign for girls aged 14.

===== Ireland =====
The HPV vaccination programme in Ireland is part of the national strategy to protect females from cervical cancer. Since 2009, the Health Service Executive has offered the HPV vaccine, free of charge, to all girls from the first year onwards (ages 12–13). Secondary schools began implementing the vaccine program on an annual basis from September 2010 onwards. The programme was expanded to include males in 2019. Two HPV vaccines are licensed for use in Ireland: Cervarix and Gardasil. To ensure high uptake, the vaccine is administered to teenagers aged 12–13 in their first year of secondary school, with the first dose administered between September and October and the final dose in April of the following year. Males and females aged 12–13 who are outside of the traditional school setting (home school, etc.) are invited to Health service Executive clinics for their vaccines. HPV vaccination in Ireland is not mandatory and consent is obtained before vaccination. For males and females aged 16 and under, consent is granted by a parent or guardian unless it is explicitly refused by the child. Any male or female aged 16 and over may provide their own consent if they want to be vaccinated. HIQA has stated the vaccine will provide further protection, particularly to men who have sex with men. The vaccine has been extended following evidence that 25% of HPV cancers occur in men. Additionally, HIQA is aiming to replace the current vaccination, which covers 4 major HPV strains, with an updated vaccine protecting against nine strains. The cost with the "gender-neutral nine-talent" vaccine is estimated to be nearly €11.66 million over the next five years.

===== Israel =====
Introduced in 2012. Target age group 13–14. Fully financed by national health authorities only for this age group. For the year 2013–2014, girls in the eighth grade may get the vaccine free of charge only in school, and not in Ministry of Health offices or clinics. Girls in the ninth grade may receive the vaccine free of charge only at Ministry of Health offices, and not in schools or clinics. Uptake is low for several reasons: among them is that cervical cancer is rare in Israel, cost when not covered by insurance, and religious concerns.

===== Japan =====
The quadrivalent vaccine has been approved for males and the 9-valent one for females. Since 2010, young women in Japan have been eligible to receive the cervical cancer vaccination for free. In June 2013, the Japanese Ministry of Health, Labor and Welfare mandated that, before administering the vaccine, medical institutions must inform women that the ministry does not recommend it. However, the vaccine is still available at no cost to Japanese women who choose to accept the vaccination. It is widely available only since April 2013. Fully financed by national health authorities to females aged 11 to 16 years. In June 2013, however, Japan's Vaccine Adverse Reactions Review Committee (VARRC) suspended the recommendation of the vaccine due to fears of adverse events. This directive has been criticized by researchers at the University of Tokyo as a failure of governance since the decision was taken without the presentation of adequate scientific evidence. At the time, Ministry spokespeople emphasized that "The decision does not mean that the vaccine itself is problematic from the viewpoint of safety," but that they wanted time to conduct analyses on possible adverse effects, "to offer information that can make the people feel more at ease." However, the suspension of the Ministry's endorsement was still in place as of February 2019, by which time the HPV vaccination rate among younger women fell from approximately 70% in 2013 to 1% or less. Over an overlapping time period (2009–2019), the age-adjusted mortality rate from cervical cancer increased by 9.6%. Japan to Resume Active Promotion of HPV Vaccinations in April 2022. In December 2021, the Ministry of Health, Labour and Welfare has decided to allow free vaccines to women born between fiscal year 1997 and 2005 after eight-year hiatus. A panel of Japan's Ministry of Health, Labour and Welfare agreed to give women (born between fiscal 1997 and fiscal 2005), free vaccinations, if they missed the country's free vaccination program. 225,993 girls were vaccinated for the first round of routine vaccination in 2022, and the vaccination rate was 42.2%. The Osaka University Graduate School of Medicine and Faculty of Medicine reported the first vaccination rate and cumulative first vaccination rate for each year of birth in 2022 at a meeting of the Ministry of Health, Labor and Welfare.

Human Papillomavirus Vaccination by Birth Fiscal Year in Japan

===== Laos =====
In 2013, Laos began implementation of the HPV vaccine, with the assistance of Gavi, the Vaccine Alliance.

===== Malaysia =====
In 2010, Malaysia launched a national vaccination program to provide three doses of HPV vaccines to all 13-year-old girls. In 2015, the program transitioned to a two-dose regimen.

High rates of school enrolment for 13-year-olds (96.0%) and retention of female students in secondary schools have made it possible for the HPV vaccination to be integrated into the School Health Service Program and ensure equal access to the HPV vaccine between urban and rural areas.

===== Mexico =====
The vaccine was introduced in 2008 to 5% of the population. This percentage of the population had the lowest development index which correlates with the highest incidence of cervical cancer. The HPV vaccine is delivered to girls 12 – 16 years old following the 0-2-6 dosing schedule. By 2009 Mexico had expanded the vaccine use to girls, 9–12 years of age, the dosing schedule in this group was different, the time elapsed between the first and second dose was six months, and the third dose 60 months later. In 2011 Mexico approved a nationwide use of HPV vaccination program to include vaccination of all 9-year-old girls.

===== New Zealand =====
Immunization as of 2017 is free for males and females aged 9 to 26 years.

The public funding began on 1 September 2008. The vaccine was initially offered only to girls, usually through a school-based program in Year 8 (approximately age 12), but also through general practices and some family planning clinics. Over 200,000 New Zealand girls and young women have received HPV immunization.

===== Panama =====
The vaccine was added to the national immunization program in 2008, to target 10-year-old girls.

===== South Korea =====
On 27 July 2007, South Korean government approved Gardasil for use in girls and women aged 9 to 26 and boys aged 9 to 15. Approval for use in boys was based on safety and immunogenicity but not efficacy.

Since 2016, HPV vaccination has been part of the National Immunization Program, offered free of charge to all children under 12 in South Korea, with costs fully covered by the Korean government.

For 2016 only, Korean girls born between 1 January 2003 and 31 December 2004 were also eligible to receive the free vaccinations as a limited-time offer. From 2017, the free vaccines are available to those under 12 only.

===== Trinidad and Tobago =====
Introduced in 2013. Target Group 9–26. Fully financed by national health authorities. But was suspended later on that year owing to objections and concerns raised by the Catholic Board, but fully available in local health centers.

===== United Arab Emirates =====
The World Health Organization ranks cervical cancer as the fourth most frequent cancer among women in UAE, at 7.4 per 100,000 women, and according to Abu Dhabi Health Authority, the cancer is also the seventh highest cause of death of women in the U.A.E.

In 2007, the HPV vaccine was approved for girls and young women, 15 to 26 years of age, and offered optionally at hospitals and clinics. Moreover, starting 1 June 2013, the vaccine was offered free of charge for women between the ages of 18 and 26, in Abu Dhabi. However, on 14 September 2018, the U.A.E's Ministry of Health and Community Protection announced that HPV vaccine became a mandatory part of the routine vaccinations for all girls in the U.A.E. The vaccine is to be administers to all school girls in the 8th grade girls, aged 13.

===== United Kingdom =====
In the UK the vaccine is licensed for females aged 9–26, for males aged 9–15, and for men who have sex with men aged 18–45.

HPV vaccination was introduced into the national immunisation programme in September 2008, for girls aged 12–13 across the UK. A two-year catch-up campaign started in Autumn 2009 to vaccinate all girls up to 18 years of age. Catch-up vaccination was offered to girls aged between 16 and 18 from autumn 2009, and girls aged between 15 and 17 from autumn 2010. It will be many years before the vaccination programme affects cervical cancer incidence so women are advised to continue accepting their invitations for cervical screening. Men who have sex with men up to and including the age of 45 became eligible for free HPV vaccination on the NHS in April 2018. They get the vaccine by visiting sexual health clinics and HIV clinics in England. A meta-analysis of vaccinations for men who have sex with men showed that this strategy is most effective when combined with gender-neutral vaccination of all boys, regardless of their sexual orientation.

From the 2019/2020 school year, it is expected that 12- to 13-year-old boys will also become eligible for the HPV vaccine as part of the national immunisation programme. This follows a statement by the Joint Committee on Vaccination and Immunisation. The first dose of the HPV vaccine will be offered routinely to boys aged 12 and 13 in school year 8, in the same way that it is currently (May 2018) offered to girls. Boots UK opened a private HPV vaccination service to boys and men aged 12–44 years in April 2017 at a cost of £150 per vaccination. In children aged 12–14 years two doses are recommended, while those aged 15–44 years a course of three is recommended.

Cervarix was the HPV vaccine offered from its introduction in September 2008, to August 2012, with Gardasil being offered from September 2012. The change was motivated by Gardasil's added protection against genital warts.

===== United States =====
====== Adoption ======
On 30 August 2021, fifteen leading academic and freestanding cancer centers with membership in the Association of American Cancer Institutes (AACI), all National Cancer Institute (NCI)-designated cancer centers, the American Cancer Society, the American Society of Clinical Oncology, the American Association for Cancer Research, and the St. Jude Children's Research Hospital have issued a joint statement urging the US health care systems, physicians, parents, children, and young adults to get HPV vaccination and other recommended vaccinations back on track during the National Immunization Awareness Month.

As of late 2007, about one-quarter of US females aged 13–17 years had received at least one of the three HPV shots. By 2014, the proportion of such females receiving an HPV vaccination had risen to 38%. The government began recommending vaccination for boys in 2011; by 2014, the vaccination rate among boys (at least one dose) had reached 35%.

According to the US Centers for Disease Control and Prevention (CDC), getting as many girls vaccinated as early and as quickly as possible will reduce the cases of cervical cancer among middle-aged women in 30 to 40 years and reduce the transmission of this highly communicable infection. Barriers include the limited understanding by many people that HPV causes cervical cancer, the difficulty of getting pre-teens and teens into the doctor's office to get a shot, and the high cost of the vaccine ($120/dose, $360 total for the three required doses, plus the cost of doctor visits). Community-based interventions can increase the uptake of HPV vaccination among adolescents.

A survey was conducted in 2009 to gather information about knowledge and adoption of the HPV vaccine. Thirty percent of 13- to 17-year-olds and 9% of 18- to 26-year-olds out of the total 1,011 young women surveyed reported receipt of at least one HPV injection. Knowledge about HPV varied; however, 5% or fewer subjects believed that the HPV vaccine precluded the need for regular cervical cancer screening or safe-sex practices. Few girls and young women overestimate the protection provided by the vaccine. Despite moderate uptake, many females at risk of acquiring HPV have not yet received the vaccine. For example, young black women are less likely to receive HPV vaccines compared to young white women. Additionally, young women of all races and ethnicities without health insurance are less likely to get vaccinated.

As of 2017, Gardasil 9 is the only HPV vaccine available in the United States as it provides protection against more HPV types than the earlier approved vaccines (the original Gardasil and Cervarix). Since the approval of Gardasil in 2006 and despite low vaccine uptake, prevalence of HPV among teenagers aged 14–19 has been cut in half with an 88% reduction among vaccinated women. No decline in prevalence was observed in other age groups, indicating the vaccine to have been responsible for the sharp decline in cases. The drop in number of infections is expected to in turn lead to a decline in cervical and other HPV-related cancers in the future.

====== Legislation ======
Four states have laws that require HPV vaccination for school students: Hawaii, Rhode Island, Virginia, and Washington D.C. Students in those states must have started HPV vaccination before entering the 7th grade. All school immunization laws grant exemptions to children for medical reasons, with other "opt-out" policies varying by state.

Shortly after the first HPV vaccine was approved, bills to make the vaccine mandatory for school attendance were introduced in many states. Only two such bills passed (in Virginia and Washington DC) during the first four years after vaccine introduction. Mandates have been effective at increasing uptake of other vaccines, such as mumps, measles, rubella, and hepatitis B (which is also sexually transmitted). However most such efforts developed for five or more years after vaccine release, while financing and supply were arranged, further safety data was gathered, and education efforts increased understanding, before mandates were considered. Most public policies including school mandates have not been effective in promoting HPV vaccination while receiving a recommendation from a physician increased the probability of vaccination.

In July 2015, Rhode Island added an HPV vaccine requirement for admittance into public schools. This mandate requires all students entering the seventh grade to receive at least one dose of the HPV vaccine starting in August 2015, all students entering the eighth grade to receive at least two doses of the HPV vaccine starting in August 2016, and all students entering the ninth grade to receive at least three doses of the HPV vaccine starting in August 2017. No legislative action is required for the Rhode Island Department of Health to add new vaccine mandates. Rhode Island is the only state that requires the vaccine for both male and female 7th graders.

====== Immigrants ======
Between July 2008 and December 2009, proof of the first of three doses of HPV Gardasil vaccine was required for women ages 11–26 intending to legally enter the United States. This requirement stirred controversy because of the cost of the vaccine, and because all the other vaccines so required to prevent diseases that are spread by respiratory route and considered highly contagious. The Centers for Disease Control and Prevention repealed all HPV vaccination directives for immigrants effective 14 December 2009. Uptake in the United States appears to vary by ethnicity and whether someone was born outside the United States.

====== Coverage ======
Measures have been considered including requiring insurers to cover HPV vaccination and funding HPV vaccines for those without insurance. The cost of the HPV vaccines for females under 18 who are uninsured is covered under the federal Vaccines for Children Program. As of 23 September 2010, vaccines are required to be covered by insurers under the Patient Protection and Affordable Care Act. HPV vaccines specifically are to be covered at no charge for women, including those who are pregnant or nursing.

Medicaid covers HPV vaccination in accordance with the ACIP recommendations, and immunizations are a mandatory service under Medicaid for eligible individuals under age 21. In addition, Medicaid includes the Vaccines for Children Program. This program provides immunization services for people 18 and under who are Medicaid eligible, uninsured, underinsured, receiving immunizations through a Federally Qualified Health Center or Rural Health Clinic, or are Native American or Alaska Native.

The vaccine manufacturers also offer help for people who cannot afford HPV vaccination. GlaxoSmithKline's Vaccines Access Program provides Cervarix free of charge 1-877-VACC-911 to low-income women, ages 19 to 25, who do not have insurance. Merck's Vaccine Patient Assistance Program 1-800-293-3881 provides Gardasil free to low-income women and men, ages 19 to 26, who do not have insurance, including immigrants who are legal residents.

====== Opposition in the United States ======
The idea that the HPV vaccine is linked to increased sexual behavior is not supported by scientific evidence. A review of nearly 1,400 adolescent girls found no difference in teen pregnancy, incidence of sexually transmitted infection, or contraceptive counseling regardless of whether they received the HPV vaccine. Thousands of Americans die each year from cancers preventable by the vaccine. A disproportionate rate of HPV-related cancers exists amongst LatinX populations, leading researchers to explore how communication and messaging can be adjusted to address vaccine hesitancy.

====== Insurance companies ======
In 2007, there was significant opposition from health insurance companies to covering the cost of the vaccine ($360). As of 2026, the estimated cost in the United States is $257/dose, largely covered by insurance.

====== Religious and conservative groups ======
Opposition due to the safety of the vaccine has been addressed through studies, but there is still some opposition focused on the sexual implications of the vaccine. Conservative groups in the US, such as Focus on the Family, have opposed the concept of making HPV vaccination mandatory for pre-adolescent girls, claiming that making the vaccine mandatory is a violation of parental rights and that it will give a false sense of immunity to sexually transmitted infection, leading to early sexual activity. (See Peltzman effect) Both the Family Research Council and the group Focus on the Family support widespread (universal) availability of HPV vaccines but oppose mandatory HPV vaccinations for entry to public school. Parents also express confusion over recent mandates for entry to public school, pointing out that HPV is transmitted through sexual contact, not through attending school with other children.

Conservative groups are concerned children will see the vaccine as a safeguard against STIs and will have sex sooner than they would without the vaccine while failing to use contraceptives. However, the American Academy of Pediatrics disagreed with the argument that the vaccine increases sexual activity among teens. Christine Peterson, director of the University of Virginia's Gynecology Clinic, said "The presence of seat belts in cars doesn't cause people to drive less safely. The presence of a vaccine in a person's body doesn't cause them to engage in risk-taking behavior they would not otherwise engage in." A 2018 study of college-aged students found that HPV vaccination did not increase sexual activity.

====== Parental opposition ======
Many parents opposed to providing the HPV vaccine to their pre-teens agree the vaccine is safe and effective, but find talking to their children about sex uncomfortable. Elizabeth Lange, of Waterman Pediatrics in Providence, RI, addresses this concern by emphasizing what the vaccine is doing for the child. Lange suggests parents should focus on the cancer prevention aspect without being distracted by words like 'sexually transmitted'. Everyone wants cancer prevention, yet here parents are denying their children a form of protection due to the nature of the cancer—Lange suggests that this much controversy would not surround a breast cancer or colon cancer vaccine. The HPV vaccine is suggested for 11-year-olds because it should be administered before possible exposure to HPV, but also because the immune system has the highest response for creating antibodies around this age. Lange also emphasized the studies showing that the HPV vaccine does not cause children to be more promiscuous than they would be without the vaccine.

Controversy over the HPV vaccine remains present in the media. Parents in Rhode Island have created a Facebook group called "Rhode Islanders Against Mandated HPV Vaccinations" in response to Rhode Island's mandate that males and females entering the 7th grade, as of September 2015, be vaccinated for HPV before attending public school.

====== Physician impact ======
The effectiveness of a physician's recommendation for the HPV vaccine also contributes to low vaccination rates and controversy surrounding the vaccine. A 2015 study of national physician communication and support for the HPV vaccine found physicians routinely recommend HPV vaccines less strongly than they recommend Tdap or meningitis vaccines, find the discussion about HPV to be long and burdensome, and discuss the HPV vaccine last, after all other vaccines. Researchers suggest these factors discourage patients and parents from setting up timely HPV vaccines. To increase vaccination rates, this issue must be addressed and physicians should be better trained to handle discussing the importance of the HPV vaccine with patients and their families.

=== Ethics ===
Some researchers have compared the need for adolescent HPV vaccination to that of other childhood diseases such as chicken pox, measles, and mumps. This is because vaccination before infection decreases the risk of several forms of cancer.

There has been some controversy around the HPV vaccine's rollout and distribution. Countries have taken different routes based on economics and social climate leading to issues of forced vaccination and marginalization of segments of the population in some cases.

The rollout of a country's vaccination program is more divisive, compared to the act of providing vaccination against HPV. In more affluent countries, arguments have been made for publicly funded programs aimed at vaccinating all adolescents voluntarily. These arguments are supported by World Health Organization (WHO) surveys showing the effectiveness of cervical cancer prevention with HPV vaccination.

In developing countries, the cost of the vaccine, dosing schedule, and other factors have led to suboptimal levels of vaccination. Future research is focused on low-cost generics and single-dose vaccination in efforts to make the vaccine more accessible.

== Research ==
There are high-risk HPV types that are not affected by available vaccines. Ongoing research is focused on the development of HPV vaccines that will offer protection against a broader range of HPV types. One such method is a vaccine based on the minor capsid protein L2, which is highly conserved across HPV genotypes. Efforts for this have included boosting the immunogenicity of L2 by linking together short amino acid sequences of L2 from different oncogenic HPV types or by displaying L2 peptides on a more immunogenic carrier. There is also substantial research interest in the development of therapeutic vaccines, which seek to elicit immune responses against established HPV infections and HPV-induced cancers.

=== After exposure ===
Although HPV vaccination is most encouraged before any exposure to the target strains, its use is still beneficial in women who have contracted some of the target types because it's unlikely for a person to have been exposed to all target types. According to a 2008 article by the editor-in-chief of Harvard Women's Health Watch, the quadrivalent vaccine is able to reduce the occurrence of warts and precancerous lesions in HPV-positive women, and also appeared to reduce the chance of infection by non-targeted types. A 2023 review article finds that vaccination reduces the chance of further HPV-associated diseases even in those already showing HPV-related precancers and diseases. At this point the standard vaccine is not believed to be therapeutic, so this effect is attributed to the vaccine preventing the establishment of new infections.

=== Therapeutic vaccines ===
In addition to preventive vaccines, laboratory research, and several human clinical trials are focused on the development of therapeutic HPV vaccines. In general, these vaccines focus on the main HPV oncogenes, E6 and E7. Since expression of E6 and E7 is required for promoting the growth of cervical cancer cells (and cells within warts), it is hoped that immune responses against the two oncogenes might eradicate established tumors.

There is a working therapeutic HPV vaccine. It has gone through three clinical trials. The vaccine is officially called the MEL-1 vaccine but also known as the MVA-E2 vaccine. In a study it has been suggested that an immunogenic peptide pool containing epitopes that can be effective against all the high-risk HPV strains circulating globally and 14 conserved immunogenic peptide fragments from four early proteins (E1, E2, E6 and E7) of 16 high-risk HPV types providing CD8+ responses.

Therapeutic DNA vaccine VGX-3100, which consists of plasmids pGX3001 and pGX3002, has been granted a waiver by the European Medicines Agency for pediatric treatment of squamous intraepithelial lesions of the cervix caused by HPV types 16 and 18. According to an article published 16 September 2015 in The Lancet, which reviewed the safety, efficacy, and immunogenicity of VGX-3100 in a double-blind, randomized controlled trial (phase 2b) targeting HPV-16 and HPV-18 E6 and E7 proteins for cervical intraepithelial neoplasia 2/3, it is the first therapeutic vaccine to show efficacy against CIN 2/3 associated with HPV-16 and HPV-18. In June 2017, VGX-3100 entered a phase III clinical trial called REVEAL-1 for the treatment of HPV-induced high-grade squamous intraepithelial lesions. The estimated completion time for collecting primary clinical endpoint data is August 2019.

As of October 2020, there are multiple therapeutic HPV vaccines in active development and in clinical trials, based on diverse vaccine platforms (protein-based, viral vector, bacterial vector, lipid encapsulated mRNA).

=== Awards ===
In 2009, as part of the Q150 celebrations, the cervical cancer vaccine was announced as one of the Q150 Icons of Queensland for its role in "innovation and invention".

In 2017, National Cancer Institute scientists Douglas R. Lowy and John T. Schiller received the Lasker-DeBakey Clinical Medical Research Award for their contributions leading to the development of HPV vaccines.
