= Jian Zhou =

Chinese virologist and cancer researcher

- Born: 24 February 1957; Hangzhou, Zhejiang, China
- Died: 9 March 1999 (aged 42); Hangzhou, Zhejiang, China
- Education: University of Queensland; University of Cambridge
- Scientific career
- Fields: Virology; Immunology
- Workplaces: Wenzhou Medical College; Zhejiang University; Zhengzhou University

Jian Zhou (Chinese: 周健; pinyin: Zhōu Jiàn; 24 February 1957 – 9 March 1999) was a Chinese virologist and cancer researcher, who with fellow researcher Ian Frazer, invented Gardasil and Cervarix, the vaccines for stimulating human immunological resistance to the cervical cancer-inducing human papilloma virus.

== Early life and education ==
Zhou was born in 1957 in Hangzhou, Zhejiang, China. He was admitted to Wenzhou Medical College in 1977 and graduated 1982. His wife Xiao-Yi Sun (孙小依) was his classmate at the college. He subsequently earned a master's degree from Zhejiang Medical University, where he pursued his research interest in HPV. He then earned his M.D. at Henan Medical University (now medical school of Zhengzhou University) and worked as a postdoctoral researcher at Beijing Medical University, before moving to the University of Cambridge in 1988 to continue his research in cancer and virus.

== HPV and Papilloma vaccine ==
Zhou met future research partner Ian Frazer at the University of Cambridge in 1989, bonded by a mutual respect and willingness to push the limits of their research. The two considered the problem of developing a vaccine for HPV – a virus that cannot be cultured without living tissue.

Frazer convinced Zhou to join him at the University of Queensland, Brisbane, and in 1990 they began to use molecular biology to synthesize particles in vitro that could mimic the virus. In March 1991 Zhou's wife and fellow researcher, Xiao-Yi Sun, assembled by Zhou's instructions two proteins into a virus-like particle (VLP), resembling the HPV shell, from which HPV vaccine would ultimately be made.

The vaccine completely protects unexposed women against four HPV strains responsible for 70% of cervical cancers, which kill about 250,000 women annually.

Frazer and Zhou filed a provisional patent in June 1991 and began work on developing the vaccine within UQ. To finance clinical trials, Australian medical company CSL, and later Merck, were sold partial patents. (CSL has the exclusive license to sell Gardasil in New Zealand and Australia, Merck the license elsewhere.) GlaxoSmithKline independently used the same VLP-approach to develop Cervarix, under a later US patent, licensing Frazer's intellectual property in 2005.

== Death ==
In March 1999, Zhou died of hepatitis, a disease he had contracted as a young man in China. He was survived by his wife Xiao-Yi Sun and son Andreas Zhou.

In 2008, Zhou's contribution to his efforts in research, including his work with the Gardasil vaccine, were formally recognised with a commemorative service attended by over 300 people, and included a written tribute from the Australian Prime Minister of the time, Kevin Rudd in Brisbane, Australia.

== Published papers ==
- Zhou et al. “Increased Expression of Vaccinia Recombinant HVP 16 L1 and L2 ORF Proteins in Epithelium Cells Is Sufficient for Assembly of HVP Virion Like Particles”, J. Gen. Virology, 1990, pp. 2185–2190, Vol. 71.
- Zhou et al. “Increased Antibody Responses to Human Papilloma Virus Type 16 L1 Protein Expressed by Recombinant Vaccine Virus Lacking Serine Protease Inhibitor Genes”, Chemical Abstracts, Nov. 5, 1990, Vol. 13, No. 19
- Zhou et al. “Human Pappilomavirus Type 16 Virions Produced by Recombinant Viccinia Virus”, Abstract from 1991 Papilloma Virus Workshop (Seattle, WA 1991)
- J. Zhou, X.Y. Sun, D.J. Stenzel, I.H. Frazer, “Expression of Vaccinia Recombinant HPV 16 L1 and L2 ORF Proteins in Epithelial Cells”, 185 Journal of Virology 251 (1991), pp 251–257
