= Ian Frazer =

Scottish-born Australian immunologist (born 1953)

Ian Hector Frazer AC FRCPE FRCPA FAA FTSE
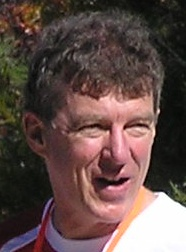
- Frazer in 2008
- Born: 6 January 1953 (age 73); Glasgow, Scotland
- Education: University of Edinburgh (BSc), (M.B.B.S.); Walter and Eliza Hall Institute of Medical Research; University of Melbourne (M.D.)
- Known for: HPV vaccine creation
- Awards: Australian of the Year (2006), Prime Minister's Prize for Science (2008), Australian Living Treasure (2012), Companion of the Order of Australia (2012)
- Scientific career
- Fields: Immunology
- Workplaces: Translational Research Institute, University of Queensland

Ian Hector Frazer AC (born 6 January 1953) is a Scottish-born Australian immunologist, the founding CEO and Director of Research of the Translational Research Institute (Australia). Frazer and Jian Zhou developed and patented the basic technology behind the HPV vaccine against cervical cancer at the University of Queensland. Researchers at the National Cancer Institute, Georgetown University, and University of Rochester also contributed to the further development of the cervical cancer vaccine in parallel.

== Education ==
Frazer was born in Glasgow, Scotland. His parents were medical scientists, and he was drawn to science from a young age.

Frazer attended Aberdeen private school Robert Gordon's College. He chose to pursue medicine over an earlier interest in physics due to physics having fewer research opportunities, and he received his Bachelor of Science and Bachelor of Medicine and Bachelor of Surgery, at the University of Edinburgh in 1974 and 1977 respectively. It was during this time that he met his wife Caroline, whom he married in 1976. His 1978–79 residency was in the Edinburgh Eastern General Hospital, the Edinburgh Royal Infirmary and the Roodlands General Hospital in Haddington.

In 1980/81, Frazer immigrated to Melbourne after he was headhunted by Dr. Ian Mackay at the Walter and Eliza Hall Institute of Medical Research to research viral immunology. In 1981 he discovered that the immunodeficiency afflicting homosexuals in San Francisco was also found in the gay men in his hepatitis B study, and in 1984 helped to confirm that HIV was a cause. It was also found that another sexually transmitted virus was having a surprising effect: the human papilloma virus (HPV) infection seemed to be inducing precancerous cells.

In 1985, he moved to the University of Queensland as a Senior Lecturer, with the opportunity to establish his own research laboratory. It was here in the Lions Human Immunology Laboratories he continued to research HPV in men, and contributed to HIV research. During this time Frazer also taught at the university and ran diagnostic tests for the Princess Alexandra Hospital and received his Doctor of Medicine qualification in 1988.

== Breakthrough ==
On a 1989 sabbatical he met virologist Jian Zhou, and the two considered the problem of developing a vaccine for HPV – a virus that cannot be cultured without living tissue. Frazer convinced Zhou to join him, and in 1990 they began to use molecular biology to synthesize particles in vitro that could mimic the virus. In March 1991 Zhou's wife and fellow researcher, Xiao-Yi Sun, assembled by Zhou's instructions two proteins into a virus-like particle (VLP), resembling the HPV shell, from which HPV vaccine would ultimately be made. The vaccine completely protects unexposed women against four HPV strains responsible for 70% of cervical cancers, which kill about 250,000 women annually. Frazer and Zhou filed a provisional patent in June 1991 and began work on developing the vaccine within UQ. To finance clinical trials, Australian medical company CSL, and later Merck, were sold partial patents. (CSL has the exclusive license to sell Gardasil in New Zealand and Australia, Merck the license elsewhere.) GlaxoSmithKline independently used the same VLP-approach to develop Cervarix, under a later US patent, licensing Frazer's intellectual property in 2005.

Later in 1991 the research was presented at a US scientific meeting, and Frazer became Director of the Centre for Immunology and Cancer Research at the University of Queensland (later renamed The Diamantina Institute for Cancer, Immunology and Metabolic Medicine, where he held a personal chair as director). After three years in design, Gardasil went into testing, and Frazer became a professor in the university's Department of Medicine. In 1998 Frazer completed the first human trials for Gardasil, and became an Australian citizen.

== Pioneer Patent for VLPs and the HPV vaccine ==
US. 7,476,389, titled "Papilloma Virus Vaccines", was granted to co-inventors Ian Frazer and Jian Zhou (posthumously) on 13 January 2009. Its U.S. application was filed on 19 January 1994, but claimed priority under a 20 July 1992 PCT filing to the date of an initial [AU] Australian patent application filed on 19 July 1991.

== Celebrity ==
In 2006, results from the four-year Phase III trials led to Australian and US regulatory approval. Frazer's studies showed 100% efficacious protective immunity in HPV naïve women, but could not directly test protective immunity (against HPV exposure) in adolescent girls. As a surrogate test, antibody titer levels in vaccinated 9 to 15-year-old girls was shown high enough to give them the same level of immunity as vaccinated women. It has been suggested that one way to bring cheaper equivalent vaccines to market is to mandate a similar induced immune response.

Frazer administered the first official HPV-vaccination, and was made 2006 Queenslander of the Year and Australian of the Year.

In the 2007 resolution of their US patent lawsuit, Frazer's and Jian Zhou's heirs (Zhou, who died in 1999, was survived by his widow Xiao-Yi Sun and a son Andreas) world-wide rights to the fundamental VLP science, and Frazer's and Zhou's priority to invention of that fundamental VLP science, were both established.

After 2009 reports of adverse Gardasil reactions, Frazer said "Apart from a very, very rare instance where you get an allergic reaction from the vaccine, which is about one in a million, there is nothing else that can be directly attributable to the vaccine." Ian Frazer is one of the "most trusted" Australians, and some critics have accused Gardasil's advocates of exploiting patriotism to promote its rapid Australian release. (Australia's government had the world's most generous coverage for the drug, though it is the nation with the lowest cervical cancer mortality.)

== Personal ==
Ian Frazer lives in Brisbane, Australia with his wife Caroline. As of 2010, two of his sons are medical students and the third is a veterinary scientist.

== Awards and honours ==
In 1999 Frazer received the Australian Biotechnology Award, and has since received more than twenty awards for science:

- 1999: Business/Higher Education Round Table award for Collaborative Research
- 2003: Centenary Medal for services to cancer research
- 2005: John Curtin Medal
- 2005: CSIRO Eureka Prize for Leadership in Science
- 2006: Distinguished Fellowship Award, Royal College of Pathologists
- 2006: Queenslander of the Year / Australian of the Year
- 2006: William B. Coley Award (with Harald zur Hausen)
- 2007: Novartis Prize for Clinical Immunology, Rio de Janeiro
- 2007: Golden Plate Award, American Academy of Achievement
- 2007: International Life Award for Scientific Research
- 2007: Clunies Ross Award, Academy of Technological Sciences and Engineering
- 2007: Howard Florey Medal for Medical Research
- 2008: Prime Minister's Prize for Science
- 2008: Balzan Prize for Preventive Medicine
- 2008: Ramaciotti Medal
- 2008: American Academy of Dermatology Lila Gruber Award for Dermatology
- 2009: Australian Medical Association Gold Medal
- 2011: elected Fellow of the Royal Society
- 2018: Elected a Corresponding Fellow of the Royal Society of Edinburgh
- 2022: Grand Hamdan International Award - Infectious Diseases

In 2012 Frazer was named as a National Living Treasure by the National Trust of Australia (NSW).

On 11 June 2012, Frazer was named a Companion of the Order of Australia (AC) for "eminent service to medical research, particularly through leadership roles in the discovery of the Human Papilloma Virus vaccine and its role in preventing cervical cancer, to higher education and as a supporter of charitable organisations."

== earlier work ==
=== Herpes ===
In February 2014, it was announced that Frazer's new vaccine against genital herpes has passed human safety trials in a trial of 20 Australians. The vaccine is designed to prevent new infections.

=== Research ===
From February 2011 to February 2015, Frazer was the CEO and Director of Research at the Translational Research Institute, a joint initiative of The University of Queensland, Queensland University of Technology, the Mater Medical Research Institute and the Princess Alexandra Hospital. He is researching immunoregulation and immunotherapeutic vaccines, supported by several US and Australian research funding bodies. He is working on a VLP-based vaccine against hepatitis C, and is researching extensions to the VLP production technology for dengue fever and Japanese encephalitis vaccines. Frazer expects (50% effective) HIV vaccines to be available by 2028. He is already overseeing trials of the first vaccine for skin cancer (the Squamous cancer, caused by HPV) which might be ready before 2020.

Frazer is the inaugural holder of the Queensland Government Smart State premier's fellowship, worth $2.5 million over 5 years. He has held continuous research funding from the National Health and Medical Research Council (NHMRC) since 1985, mostly relating to papilloma viruses or tumor immunology. He is currently a joint Chief Investigator on an NHMRC program grant and a NHMRC/Wellcome program grant, together worth more than $2 million a year.

=== Teaching and industry ===
He teaches immunology to undergraduates and graduate students at the University of Queensland, is Cancer Council Australia president, Chairman of the ACRF's Medical Research Advisory Committee, and advises the WHO and the Gates Foundation on papillomavirus vaccines.

Frazer consults for many pharmaceutical companies on Immunomodulatory drugs, prophylactic and therapeutic vaccines. He sits on the board of three for-profit small biotech companies and a number of not for profit organisations.

=== Fellowships ===
- Royal College of Physicians of Edinburgh, since 1988
- Royal College of Pathologists of Australasia, since 1989
- Australian Institute of Company Directors, since 2002
- Australian Academy of Technological Sciences and Engineering, since 2003
- Australian Academy of Science, since 2004
- Australian Academy of Health and Medical Sciences, since 2014
