= The Future Leaders =

1973 novel by Mwangi Ruheni

The Future Leaders is a 1973 novel by Kenyan novelist Mwangi Ruheni. It was published as part of the important African Writers Series. The novel is set in Kenya before its independence from Britain, following the life events of Reuben Ruoro during the transition from colony to independent country.

== Reception ==
The Complete Review gave the novel a B, writing that "The Future Leaders isn't very well written or presented, but it is a rollicking and often entertaining ride, cheerful Reuben an appealing guide (of sorts), and one does get some sense of Kenya around independence."
