= Human Papillomavirus (HPV) in Ghana =

Human Papillomavirus in Ghana
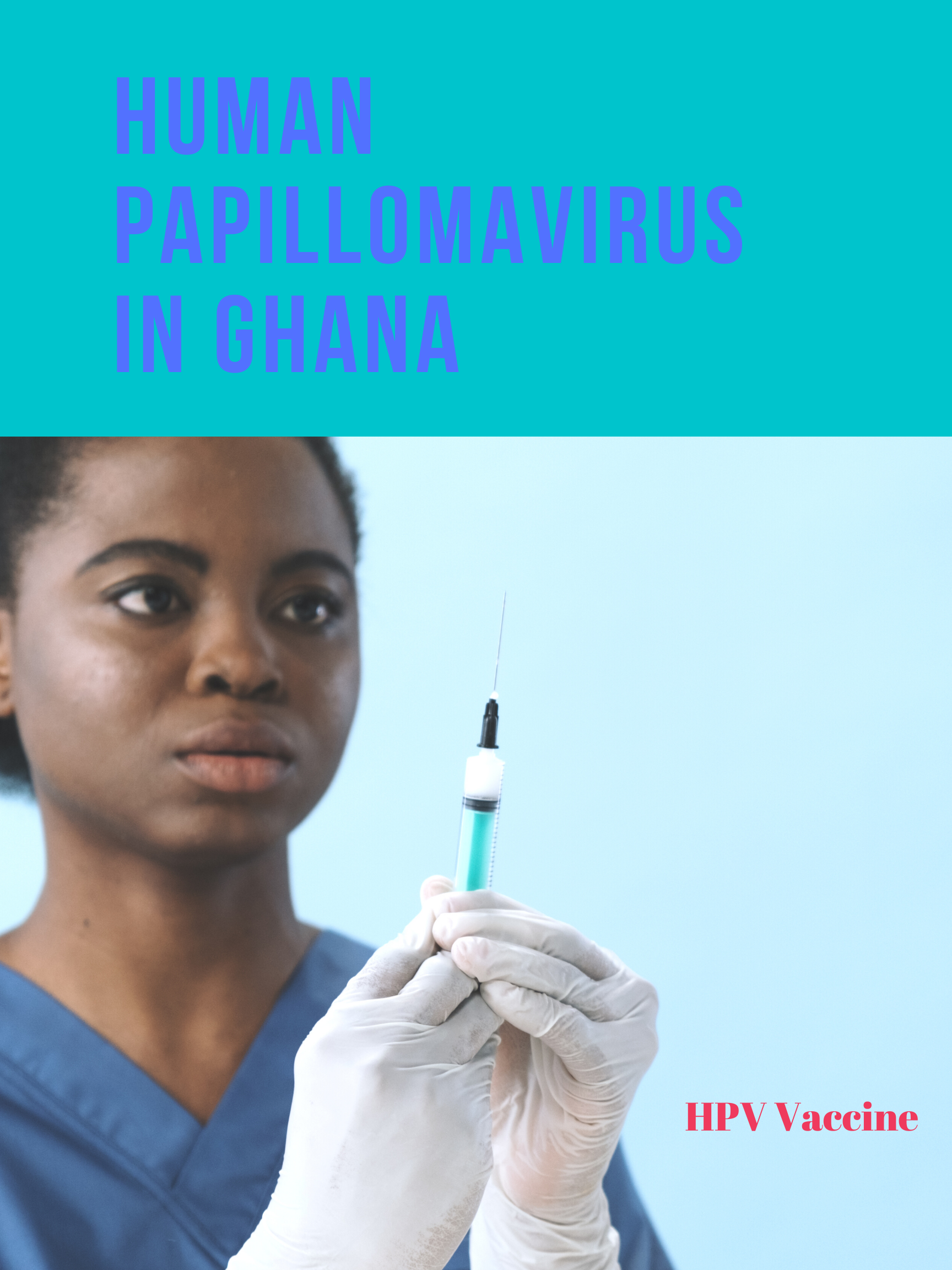
- HPV Vaccine

The State of Human Papillomavirus in Ghana.ogg
Dominic Domenyo Gadeka, gives insights on the HPV medical condition.

Human Papillomavirus in Ghana; each year about 3,000 Ghanaian women are diagnosed cervical cancer caused by Human Papillomavirus, HPV. It is estimated that 2,000 women die out of the 3000 annually.

Cervical cancer is the second most common female cancer among women between the ages of age of 15 to 44 years and a high prevalence rate in Ghana compared to the Western Africa region. 57.8% of Ghanaian women visiting the Korle -Bu Teaching Hospital with gynecological cancer had cervical cancer as well.

According to the Global cancer observatory, cervical cancer is the third highest in cancers in 2020 and among female cancers, recording the second highest number of new cases after breast cancer in Ghana. In an observation of 348 women diagnosed with cervical cancer, almost 60 per cent tested positive for HPV type 16 and 18 which is a causative factor of cervical cancer.

The increasing mortality among women with cervical cancer in Ghana suggests 26 in 100,000 Ghanaian women compared to women in most developed countries. 13.9% of pregnant women sampled for a study in the Western Region of Ghana were considered at a high risk HPV positive.

== Causes of increasing infection and mortality ==
- To begin with, late diagnosis.
- Ghana not implementing the cancer control strategy launched in 2015.
- Limited data available on the local costs and cost-effectiveness of national HPV vaccination in Ghana.
- Low awareness or lack of knowledge among individuals and some healthcare providers on HPV cancer prevention strategies.

== Challenges with Screening for HPV in Ghana ==
- Inadequate number of pathologists in Ghana mostly located in the three big cities: Accra, Kumasi, Cape Coast and Tamale.
- The cost of HPV vaccine which is currently pegged between GH¢250 and GH¢500 per dose. The recommended dose to be considered fully vaccinated is three.

== Advancement- Screening and vaccine ==
At the moment, Ghana receives significant support for the implementation of the childhood vaccination.

Ghana initiated a pilot of HPV vaccination among 10–14-year-old girls in selected regions of the country between 2013 and 2015. The country is yet to administer the vaccine across the nation.

Africa's Cancer Research Company, Yemaachi in February 2022 launched HPV molecular Test in Ghana to enable women screen for cervical cancer at home. This is a pilot initiative in two cities in Ghana, Accra and Kumasi. This would enable women to continently screen themselves, take sample, drop it at the Pharmacy where the kit was purchased and obtain results within 72 hours.
