= Mwangi Ruheni =

Nom de plume of Kenyan novelist Nicholas Muraguri

Mwangi Ruheni is the pseudonym of Kenyan novelist Nicholas Muraguri (born 1934) best known for his novels The Minister's Daughter (1975) and The Future Leaders (1973), which were published as part of the African Writers Series. Muraguri was trained as a chemist, and spent 22 years as the Chief Government Chemist of Kenya.

== Early life and education ==
Muragari attended Mang'u High School. He then went on to Makerere University in Uganda, where he studied Botany Zoology and Chemistry and became editor of the schools' creative writing journal, the St. Augustine's Newsletter. He then received a master's degree in Chemistry between 1957 and 1959, a MSc in forensic Science at the University of Strathclyde.

== Career ==
Before becoming a novelist, Ruheni trained as a scientist and had no literary background. Despite this his novels did very well with both academics and non-academics alike. Ruheni is not very forthcoming about his literary career.

He worked as a scientist in the civil service eventually becoming Chief Government Chemist, staying largely out of the public eye through most of his career, only publicly connecting himself to his pseudonym in a 1995 interview. His book Random Thoughts is largely a commentary on the literary and publishing industries.

== Works ==
The following is a list of works by Ruheni:

- School Chemistry Textbook
- What a Life! (1972) – novel
- What a Husband! (1972) – novel
- In Search of their Parents (1973) – children's book
- The Future Leaders (1973) – novel -- African Writers Series
- The Minister's Daughter (1975) – novel -- African Writers Series
- The Mystery Smugglers (1975) – novel
- The Love Root (1976) – novel
- Random Thoughts Book 1 (1995) – collection
- The Diamond Lady (2005) – novel
- Survival in Excess (2008) – non-fiction
