= Cervarix =

Human papillomavirus vaccine

Vaccine description
- Target: human papillomavirus (Types 16 and 18)
- Vaccine type: Protein subunit

Clinical data
- Trade names: Cervarix
- AHFS/Drugs.com: Monograph
- MedlinePlus: a610014
- Routes of administration: Intramuscular injection
- ATC code: J07BM02 (WHO)

Legal status
- Legal status: AU: S4 (Prescription only); CA: ℞-only / Schedule D; US: ℞-only; EU: Rx-only

Identifiers
- CAS Number: 912337-47-4
- ChemSpider: none
- KEGG: D10212

Cervarix is a vaccine against certain types of cancer-causing human papillomavirus (HPV).

Cervarix is designed to prevent infection from HPV types 16 and 18, that cause about 70% of cervical cancer cases. These types also cause most HPV-induced genital and head and neck cancers. Additionally, some cross-reactive protection against virus strains 45 and 31 were shown in clinical trials. Cervarix also contains AS04, a proprietary adjuvant that has been found to boost the immune system response for a longer period of time.

Cervarix is manufactured by GlaxoSmithKline. An alternative product, from Merck & Co., is known as Gardasil. Cervarix was voluntarily taken off the market in the US in 2016 due to low demand.

== Medical uses ==
HPV is a virus, usually transmitted sexually, which can cause cervical cancer in a small percentage of those women genital infected. Cervarix is a preventative HPV vaccine, not therapeutic. HPV immunity is type-specific, so a successful series of Cervarix shots will not block infection from cervical cancer-causing HPV types other than HPV types 16 and 18 and some related types, so experts continue to recommend routine cervical Pap smears even for women who have been vaccinated. Vaccination alone, without continued screening, would prevent fewer cervical cancers than regular screening alone.

Cervarix is indicated for the prevention of the following diseases caused by oncogenic HPV types 16 and 18: cervical cancer, cervical intraepithelial neoplasia (CIN) grade 2 or worse and adenocarcinoma in situ, and CIN grade 1. In the United States, Cervarix is approved for use in females 10 through 25 years of age while in some other countries the age limit is at least 45.

As of September 2009, Cervarix was shown to be effective 7.3 years after vaccination.

=== Administration ===
Immunization with Cervarix consists of 3 doses of 0.5-mL each, by intramuscular injection according to the following schedule: 0, 1, and 6 months. The preferred site of administration is the deltoid region of the upper arm. Cervarix is available in 0.5-mL single-dose vials and prefilled TIP-LOK syringes.

=== Limitations of effectiveness ===
Cervarix does not provide protection against disease due to all HPV types, nor against disease if a woman has previously been exposed through sexual activity and protection may not be obtained by all recipients. It is therefore recommended that women continue to adhere to cervical cancer screening procedures.

== Adverse effects ==
- The most common local adverse reactions in ≥20% of patients were pain, redness, and swelling at the injection site.
- The most common general adverse events in ≥20% of subjects were fatigue, headache, muscle pain (myalgia), gastrointestinal symptoms, and joint pain (arthralgia).

In common with some other prefilled syringe vaccination products, the tip cap and the rubber plunger of the needleless prefilled syringes contain dry natural latex rubber that may cause allergic reactions in latex sensitive individuals. The vial stopper does not contain latex.

== Ingredients ==
The active components of the vaccine are:

- Human papillomavirus type 16 L1 protein 20 micrograms
- Human papillomavirus type 18 L1 protein 20 micrograms
- AS04 adjuvant, containing: 3-O-desacyl-4'- monophosphoryl lipid A (MPL) 50 micrograms adsorbed on aluminium hydroxide, hydrated (Al(OH)_{3}) 0.5 milligrams Al^{3+} in total

=== Biotechnology ===
Cervarix is created using the L1 protein of the viral capsid. L1 protein is in the form of non-infectious virus-like particles (VLPs) produced by recombinant DNA technology using a Baculovirus expression system which uses High Five Rix4446 cells derived from the insect Trichoplusia ni. The vaccine contains no live virus and no DNA, so it cannot infect the patient.

== History ==
The research findings that pioneered the development of the vaccine began in 1991 by The University of Queensland investigators Jian Zhou and Ian Frazer in Australia . Researchers at UQ found a way to form non-infectious virus-like particles (VLP), which could also strongly activate the immune system. Subsequently, the final form of the vaccine was developed in parallel, by researchers at Georgetown University Medical Center, the University of Rochester, the University of Queensland in Australia, and the U.S. National Cancer Institute.

=== Clinical trials ===
Phase III trials have been conducted, including over 18,000 women from 14 countries in Asia-Pacific, Europe, Latin America and North America.

As of 2009, the manufacturer was conducting a trial to compare the immunogenicity and safety of Cervarix with Gardasil. Subsequent studies showed Cervarix generated higher antibody levels than Gardasil, the other commercially available HPV vaccine, upon testing seven months later, with twice the level for HPV type 16 and six times for HPV type 18.

== Society and culture ==
=== Legal status ===
- Australia - Cervarix received approval in May 2007 in Australia for women ages 10 to 45.
- Philippines - On 25 August 2007, GlaxoSmithKline launched Cervarix in the Philippines after approval by the local Bureau of Food and Drugs.
- European Union - Cervarix was approved in September 2007 in the European Union.
- United States - The FDA approved Cervarix on 16 October 2009.
  - On 29 March 2007, GlaxoSmithKline submitted a Biologic License Application (BLA) for Cervarix (human papillomavirus vaccine, AS04 adjuvant-adsorbed), to the U.S. Food and Drug Administration (FDA) which included data from clinical trials in almost 30,000 females 10 to 55 years of age and contains data from the largest Phase III cervical cancer vaccine efficacy trial to that date.
  - GSK had awaited results of further trials to submit to the FDA. Approval had not been expected before late 2009.
- In the United Kingdom it was included in the national vaccination programme for teenage and pre-teenage girls aged 12–13 and 17–18 from September 2008 to August 2012. This caused some controversy since Cervarix was chosen over Gardasil, even though Gardasil protects against additional HPV types 6 and 11 (which cause genital warts). However, the efficacy of Cervarix is higher.
- In Japan, Cervarix (GlaxoSmithKline) was approved in October 2009 and released in December.
