= Gardasil =

Human papillomavirus vaccine

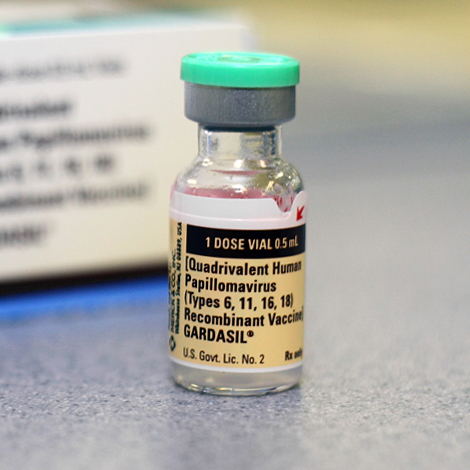
- Gardasil quadrivalent HPV [types 6, 11, 16, 18]

Vaccine description
- Target: For Gardasil 9: Human papillomavirus, Types 6, 11, 16, 18, 31, 33, 45, 52, and 58
- Vaccine type: Protein subunit

Clinical data
- Trade names: Gardasil, others
- AHFS/Drugs.com: Monograph
- MedlinePlus: a607016
- License data: US DailyMed: Gardasil
- Pregnancy category: AU: B2
- Routes of administration: intramuscular
- ATC code: J07BM01 (WHO) J07BM03 (WHO)

Legal status
- Legal status: AU: S4 (Prescription only); CA: ℞-only; UK: POM (Prescription only); US: ℞-only; EU: Rx-only; In general: ℞ (Prescription only)

Identifiers
- PubChem SID: 135626910
- DrugBank: DB10299; DB10300
- ChemSpider: none
- UNII: 61746O90DY; Z845VHQ61P
- KEGG: D10192

Gardasil is an HPV vaccine for use in the prevention of certain strains of human papillomavirus (HPV). It was developed by Merck & Co. High-risk human papilloma virus (hr-HPV) genital infection is the most common sexually transmitted infection among women. The HPV strains that Gardasil protects against are sexually transmitted, specifically HPV types 6, 11, 16 and 18. HPV types 16 and 18 cause an estimated 70% of cervical cancers, and are responsible for most HPV-induced anal, vulvar, vaginal, and penile cancer cases. HPV types 6 and 11 cause an estimated 90% of genital warts cases. HPV type 16 is responsible for almost 90% of HPV-positive oropharyngeal cancers, and the prevalence is higher in males than females. Though Gardasil does not treat existing infection, vaccination is still recommended for HPV-positive individuals, as it may protect against one or more different strains of the disease.

The vaccine was approved for medical use in the United States in 2006, initially for use in females aged 9–26. In 2007, the Advisory Committee on Immunization Practices recommended Gardasil for routine vaccination of girls aged 11 and 12 years. As of August 2009, vaccination was recommended for both males and females before adolescence and the beginning of potential sexual activity. By 2011, the vaccine had been approved in 120 other countries.

In 2014, the US Food and Drug Administration (FDA) approved a nine-valent version, Gardasil 9, to protect against infection with the strains covered by the first generation of Gardasil as well as five additional HPV strains responsible for 20% of cervical cancers (types 31, 33, 45, 52, and 58). In 2018, the FDA approved expanded use of Gardasil 9 for individuals 27 to 45 years old.

== Types ==
Gardasil is available as Gardasil which protects against 4 types of HPV (6, 11, 16, 18) and Gardasil 9 which protects against an additional 5 types (31, 33, 45, 52, 58).

== Medical uses ==
In the United States, Gardasil is indicated for:

- Girls and women 9 through 45 years of age for the prevention of the following diseases:
  - Cervical, vulvar, vaginal, anal, oropharyngeal and other head and neck cancers caused by Human Papillomavirus (HPV) types 16, 18, 31, 33, 45, 52, and 58.
  - Genital warts (condyloma acuminata) caused by HPV types 6 and 11.
- Girls and women 9 through 45 years of age for the following precancerous or dysplastic lesions caused by HPV types 6, 11, 16, 18, 31, 33, 45, 52, and 58:
  - Cervical intraepithelial neoplasia (CIN) grade 2/3 and cervical adenocarcinoma in situ (AIS).
  - Cervical intraepithelial neoplasia (CIN) grade 1.
  - Vulvar intraepithelial neoplasia (VIN) grade 2 and grade 3.
  - Vaginal intraepithelial neoplasia (VaIN) grade 2 and grade 3.
  - Anal intraepithelial neoplasia (AIN) grades 1, 2, and 3.
- Boys and men 9 through 45 years of age for the prevention of the following diseases:
  - Anal, oropharyngeal and other head and neck cancers caused by HPV types 16, 18, 31, 33, 45, 52, and 58.
  - Genital warts (condyloma acuminata) caused by HPV types 6 and 11.
- Boys and men 9 through 45 years of age for the following precancerous or dysplastic lesions caused by HPV types 6, 11, 16, 18, 31, 33, 45, 52, and 58:
  - Anal intraepithelial neoplasia (AIN) grades 1, 2, and 3.

In the European Union, Gardasil is indicated for active immunization of individuals from the age of nine years against the following HPV diseases:

- Premalignant lesions and cancers affecting the cervix, vulva, vagina and anus caused by vaccine HPV types
- Genital warts (Condyloma acuminata) caused by specific HPV types.

Gardasil is a vaccine to prevent HPV that, for maximum effect, is recommended for individuals prior to them becoming sexually active. Moreover, women who have already been infected with one or more of the four HPV types targeted by the vaccine (HPV types 6, 11, 16, or 18) may still be protected from clinical disease caused by the remaining HPV types in the vaccine.

Common plantar warts—e.g., caused by HPV types 1, 2, and 4—are not prevented by this vaccine.

In 2010, Gardasil was approved by the FDA for prevention of anal cancer and associated precancerous lesions due to HPV types 6, 11, 16, and 18 in people aged 9 through 26 years.

HPV infections, especially HPV 16, contribute to some head and neck cancer, with HPV found in an estimated 26–35% of head and neck squamous cell carcinoma cases. In June 2020, the FDA accordingly approved the use of Gardasil for the prevention of head and neck cancers.

The FDA approved Gardasil 9 for women and men aged 27 to 45 based on the vaccine being 88% effective against persistent HPV infections that cause certain types of genital warts and cancers in females. Vaccine efficacy in males in this age group was inferred.

=== Efficacy ===
A 2020 longitudinal study tracking over 1.6 million Swedish girls and women over an eleven-year period found half as many cervical cancer cases in all women who had been vaccinated, and amongst women who had been vaccinated before the age of 17 a 78% reduction in cervical cancer, "a substantially reduced risk of invasive cervical cancer at the population level."

An alternative vaccine known as Cervarix protects against two oncogenic strains of HPV, 16 and 18.

The National Cancer Institute says, "To date, protection against the targeted HPV types has been found to last for at least 10 years with Gardasil, at least 9 years with Cervarix, and at least 6 years with Gardasil 9. Long-term studies of vaccine efficacy that are still in progress will help scientists better understand the total duration of protection."

Gardasil has been shown to be partially effective (approximately 38%) in preventing cervical cancer caused by ten other high-risk HPV types.

Antibody levels at month 3 (one month post-dose number two) are substantially higher than at month 24 (18 months post-dose number three), suggesting that protection is achieved by month 3 and perhaps earlier. In 2014, the World Health Organization (WHO) recommended that countries offer the vaccine in a two dose schedule to girls aged under 15, with each dose at least six months apart. The United Kingdom, Switzerland, Mexico, and Quebec province of Canada are among the countries or territories that have implemented this as of June 2015. The Centers for Disease Control and Prevention (CDC) recommended the vaccines be delivered in two shots over six months.

=== Males ===
Gardasil is also effective in males, providing protection against genital warts, anal warts, anal cancer, and some potentially precancerous lesions caused by some HPV types. Gardasil vaccine has been shown to decrease the risk of young men contracting genital warts. In the United States, the FDA approved administration of the Gardasil vaccine to males between ages 9 and 26 in 2009. The FDA approved administration of the Gardasil 9 vaccine to males between ages 9 and 15 in 2014, and extended the age indication to include males between ages 16 and 26 in 2015. In the UK, HPV vaccines are licensed for males aged 9 to 15 and for females aged 9 to 26.

Men who have sex with men (MSM) are particularly at risk for conditions associated with HPV types 6, 11, 16, and 18; diseases and cancers that have a higher incidence among MSM include anal intraepithelial neoplasias, anal cancers, and genital warts. HPV type 16 is also responsible for almost 90% of HPV-positive oropharyngeal squamous-cell carcinoma (OPSCC), a form of cancer that affects the mouth, tonsils, and throat; the prevalence of HPV-positive oropharyngeal cancers is higher in males than females. A 2005 study found that 95% of HIV-infected gay men also had anal HPV infection, of whom 50% had precancerous HPV-caused lesions.

=== Administration ===
Gardasil is given in three injections over six months. The second injection is two months after the first, and the third injection is six months after the first shot was administered. Alternatively, in some countries it is given as two injections with at least six months between them, for individuals aged 9 years up to and including 13 years.

== Adverse effects ==
As of April 2014, more than 170 million doses of Gardasil had been distributed worldwide. The vaccine was tested in thousands of females (ages 9 to 26). The US Food and Drug Administration (FDA) and the US Centers for Disease Control and Prevention (CDC) consider the vaccine to be safe. It does not contain mercury, thiomersal, live viruses or dead viruses, but virus-like particles, which cannot reproduce in the human body.

The vaccine has mostly minor side effects, such as pain around the injection area. Fainting is more common among adolescents receiving the Gardasil vaccine than in other kinds of vaccinations. Patients should remain seated for 15 minutes after they receive the HPV vaccine. There have been reports that the shot is more painful than other common vaccines, and the manufacturer Merck partly attributes this to the virus-like particles within the vaccine. General side effects of the shot may include joint and muscle pain, fatigue, physical weakness and general malaise.

The FDA and the CDC said that with millions of vaccinations "by chance alone some serious adverse effects and deaths" will occur in the time period following vaccination, but they have nothing to do with the vaccine. More than twenty women who received the Gardasil vaccine have died, but these deaths have not been causally connected to the shot, as correlation does not imply causation. Where information has been available, the cause of death was explained by other factors. Likewise, a small number of cases of Guillain–Barré syndrome (GBS) have been reported following vaccination with Gardasil, though there is no evidence linking GBS to the vaccine. It is unknown why a person develops GBS, or what initiates the disease.

The FDA and the CDC monitor events to see if there are patterns, or more serious events than would be expected from chance alone. The majority (68%) of side effects data were reported by the manufacturer, but in about 90% of the manufacturer reported events, no follow-up information was given that would be useful to investigate the event further. In February 2009, the Spanish Ministry of Health suspended use of one batch of Gardasil after health authorities in the Valencia region reported that two girls had become ill after receiving the injection. Merck has stated that there was no evidence Gardasil was responsible for the two illnesses.

== Ingredients ==
The following are the ingredients found in the different formulations of HPV vaccines:

- Major capsid protein L1 epitope of HPV types 6, 11, 16, and 18 (Gardasil)
- Major capsid protein L1 epitope of HPV types 6, 11, 16, 18, 31, 33, 45, 52, and 58 (Gardasil-9)
- Major capsid protein L1 epitope of HPV types 16 and 18 (Cervarix)
- amorphous aluminum hydroxyphosphate sulfate (adjuvant)
- sodium chloride
- yeast protein
- L-histidine
- polysorbate 80
- sodium borate
- sodium dihydrogen phosphate dihydrate (Cervarix only)
- 3-O-Desacyl-4′-monophosphoryl lipid (MPL) A (Cervarix only)
- Aluminum hydroxide (Cervarix only)
- Trichoplusia ni insect cells (Cervarix only)

=== Biotechnology ===
The HPV major capsid protein, L1, can spontaneously self-assemble into virus-like particles (VLPs) that resemble authentic HPV virions. Gardasil contains recombinant VLPs assembled from the L1 proteins of HPV types 6, 11, 16 and 18. Since VLPs lack the viral DNA, they cannot induce cancer. They do, however, trigger an antibody response that protects vaccine recipients from becoming infected with the HPV types represented in the vaccine. The L1 proteins are produced by separate fermentations in recombinant Saccharomyces cerevisiae and self-assembled into VLPs.

== Public health ==
The National Cancer Institute writes:

Widespread HPV vaccination has the potential to reduce cervical cancer incidence around the world by as much as 90%. In addition, the vaccines may reduce the need for screening and subsequent medical care, biopsies, and invasive procedures associated with follow-up from abnormal cervical screening, thus helping to reduce health care costs and anxieties related to follow-up procedures.

=== Long-term impact and cost-effectiveness ===
Whether the effects are temporary or lifelong, widespread vaccination could have a substantial public health impact. As of 2018, studies have proven that cervical cancer rates have dropped significantly since the introduction of Gardasil. Before Gardasil was introduced in 2006, 270,000 women died of cervical cancer worldwide in 2002. As of 2014, the mortality rate from cervical cancer has dropped 50% from 1975 which is due to the Gardasil vaccination along with increased focus on cervical screening. Acting FDA administrator Andrew von Eschenbach said the vaccine will have "a dramatic effect" on the health of women around the world. Gardasil is an important tool in reducing cervical cancer rates even in countries where screening programs are routine. The National Cancer Institute estimated that 9,700 women would develop cervical cancer in 2006, and 3,700 would die.

Merck and CSL Limited are expected to market Gardasil as a cancer vaccine, rather than an STD vaccine. In the early years of Gardasil's introduction it was unclear how widespread the use of the three-shot series would be, in part because of its $525 list price ($175 each for three shots). But as of 2013, vaccine coverage has been rising. In 2013, about 55% of girls ages 13–17 years had at least one dose of the vaccination covered, up from 29% in 2007. Coverage for women ages 18–34 also has increased significantly since 2007.

Studies using different pharmacoeconomic models predict that vaccinating young women with Gardasil in combination with screening programs may be more cost effective than screening alone. These results have been important in decisions by many countries to start vaccination programs. For example, the Canadian government approved $300 million to buy the HPV vaccine in 2008 after deciding from studies that the vaccine would be cost-effective especially by immunizing young women. Marc Steben, an investigator for the vaccine, wrote that the financial burden of HPV related cancers on the Canadian people was already $300 million per year in 2005, so the vaccine could reduce this burden and be cost-effective.

Since penile and anal cancers are much less common than cervical cancer, HPV vaccination of young men is likely to be much less cost-effective than for young women yet is still recommended due to the existent risk (including oral cancer).

The August 2009 issue of the Journal of the American Medical Association had an article reiterating the safety of Gardasil and another questioning the way it was presented to doctors and parents.

The new vaccine against 4 types of human papillomavirus (HPV), Gardasil, like other immunizations appears to be a cost-effective intervention with the potential to enhance both adolescent health and the quality of their adult lives. However, the messages and the methods by which the vaccine was marketed present important challenges to physician practice and medical professionalism. By making the vaccine's target disease cervical cancer, the sexual transmission of HPV was minimized, the threat of cervical cancer to adolescents was maximized, and the subpopulations most at risk practically ignored. The vaccine manufacturer also provided educational grants to professional medical associations (PMAs) concerned with adolescent and women's health and oncology. The funding encouraged many PMAs to create educational programs and product-specific speakers' bureaus to promote vaccine use. However, much of the material did not address the full complexity of the issues surrounding the vaccine and did not provide balanced recommendations on risks and benefits. As important and appropriate as it is for PMAs to advocate for vaccination as a public good, their recommendations must be consistent with appropriate and cost-effective use.

According to the CDC, as of 2012, use of the HPV vaccine had cut rates of infection with HPV-6, -11, -16 and -18 in half in American teenagers (from 11.5% to 4.3%) and by one third in American women in their early twenties (from 18.5% to 12.1%).

== History ==
Research findings that pioneered the development of the vaccine began in 1991 by investigators Jian Zhou and Ian Frazer in the University of Queensland, Australia. Researchers at UQ found a way to form non-infectious virus-like particles (VLP), which could also strongly activate the immune system. Subsequently, the vaccine was developed in parallel by researchers at Georgetown University Medical Center in America, the University of Rochester in America, the University of Queensland in Australia, and the US National Cancer Institute. MedImmune, GSK, and Merck & Co. advanced these technologies and conducted clinical trials.

In December 2014, the FDA approved Gardasil 9, which protects against nine strains of HPV.

== Society and culture ==
=== United States ===
A few conservative groups, such as the Family Research Council (FRC), have expressed their fears that vaccination with Gardasil might give girls a false sense of security regarding sex and lead to promiscuity, but no evidence exists to suggest that girls who were vaccinated went on to engage in more sexual activity than unvaccinated girls. Merck, the vaccine manufacturer, has lobbied that state governments make vaccination with Gardasil mandatory for school attendance, which has upset some conservative and libertarian groups.

The governor of Texas, Rick Perry, issued an executive order adding Gardasil to the state's required vaccination list, which was later overturned by the Texas legislature. Even though Perry also allowed parents to opt out of the program more easily, Perry's order was criticized, by fellow presidential candidates Rick Santorum and Michele Bachmann during the 2012 Republican Party presidential debate as being an overreach of state power in a decision properly left to parents.

=== Canada ===
Canada's National Advisory Committee on Immunization recommended HPV vaccination in 2007 for women and in 2012 for men. The Gardasil vaccine has been available free of charge to girls 12-17 in Canada since 2010.

=== Japan ===
In June 2013, the Japanese government issued a notice that "cervical cancer vaccinations should no longer be recommended for girls aged 12 to 16" while an investigation is conducted into certain adverse events including pain and numbness in 38 girls. The vaccines sold in Japan are Cervarix, made by GSK plc (formerly GlaxoSmithKline) of the United Kingdom, and Gardasil, made by Merck Sharp & Dohme. An estimated 3.28 million people have received the vaccination; 1,968 cases of possible side effects have been reported. In January 2014, the Vaccine Adverse Reactions Review Committee concluded that there was no evidence to suggest a causal association between the HPV vaccine and the reported adverse events, but did not reinstate proactive recommendations for its use. A study on girls in Sapporo showed that since the Japanese government's suspension of recommending the vaccine, completion rates for the full course of vaccination have dropped to 0.6%. On 26 November 2021, the Ministry of Health, Labour, and Welfare of Japan officially issued an announcement to resume active recommendations of the HPV vaccine after 8.5 years of suspension and municipalities are expected to restart such active recommendations from April 2022.

=== Australia ===
In 2021, Australian health authorities reported that for the first time in the 39 years that cervical cancer had been tracked, there were zero cases of cervical cancer in women under 25. Australia’s HPV vaccination program commenced in 2007.
