= 2009 swine flu pandemic vaccine =

Protection against the H1N1/09 virus

The 2009 swine flu pandemic vaccines were influenza vaccines developed to protect against the pandemic H1N1/09 virus. These vaccines either contained inactivated (killed) influenza virus, or weakened live virus that could not cause influenza. The killed virus was injected, while the live virus was given as a nasal spray. Both these types of vaccine were produced by growing the virus in chicken eggs. Around three billion doses were produced, with delivery in November 2009.

In studies, the vaccines appeared both effective and safe, providing a strong protective immune response and having a similar safety profile to the usual seasonal influenza vaccine. However, about 30% of people already had some immunity to the virus, with the vaccine conferring greatest benefit on young people, since many older people are already immune through exposure to similar viruses in the past. The vaccine also provided some cross-protection against the 1918 flu pandemic strain. Early results (pre-25 December 2009) from an observational cohort of 248,000 individuals in Scotland showed the vaccine to be effective at preventing H1N1 influenza (95.0% effectiveness [95% confidence intervals 76.0–100.0%]) and influenza-related hospital admissions (64.7% [95% confidence intervals 12.0–85.8%]).

Developing, testing, and manufacturing sufficient quantities of a vaccine is a process that takes many months. According to Keiji Fukuda of the World Health Organization, "There's much greater vaccine capacity than there was a few years ago, but there is not enough vaccine capacity to instantly make vaccines for the entire world's population for influenza." The nasal mist version of the vaccine started shipping on 1 October 2009.

== Types ==
Two types of influenza vaccines were available:

- TIV (flu shot (injection) of trivalent (three strains; usually A/H1N1, A/H3N2, and B) inactivated (killed) vaccine) or
- LAIV (nasal spray (mist) of live attenuated influenza vaccine.)

TIV works by putting into the bloodstream those parts of three strains of flu virus that the body uses to create antibodies; while LAIV works by inoculating the body with those same three strains, but in a modified form that cannot cause illness.

LAIV is not recommended for individuals under age 2 or over age 49, but might be comparatively more effective among children over age two.

== Manufacturing methods ==
For the inactivated vaccines, the virus is grown by injecting it, along with some antibiotics, into fertilized chicken eggs. About one to two eggs are needed to make each dose of vaccine. The virus replicates within the allantois of the embryo, which is the equivalent of the placenta in mammals. The fluid in this structure is removed and the virus purified from this fluid by methods such as filtration or centrifugation. The purified viruses are then inactivated ("killed") with a small amount of a disinfectant. The inactivated virus is treated with detergent to break up the virus into particles, and the broken capsule segments and released proteins are concentrated by centrifugation. The final preparation is suspended in sterile phosphate buffered saline ready for injection. This vaccine mainly contains the killed virus but might also contain tiny amounts of egg protein and the antibiotics, disinfectant and detergent used in the manufacturing process. In multi-dose versions of the vaccine, the preservative thimerosal is added to prevent growth of bacteria. In some versions of the vaccine used in Europe and Canada, such as Arepanrix and Fluad, an adjuvant is also added, this contains squalene, vitamin E and an emulsifier called polysorbate 80.

To make the live vaccine, the virus is first adapted to grow at 25 °C (77 °F) and then grown at this temperature until it loses the ability to cause illness in humans, which requires the virus to grow at normal human body temperature of 37 °C (99 °F). Multiple mutations are needed for the virus to grow at cold temperatures, so this process is effectively irreversible and once the virus has lost virulence (become "attenuated"), it will not regain the ability to infect people. The attenuated virus is then grown in chicken eggs as before. The virus-containing fluid is harvested and the virus purified by filtration; this step also removes any contaminating bacteria. The filtered preparation is then diluted into a solution that stabilizes the virus. This solution contains monosodium glutamate, potassium phosphate, gelatin, the antibiotic gentamicin, and sugar.

A different method of producing influenza virus was used to produce the Novartis vaccine Optaflu. In this vaccine the virus is grown in cell culture instead of in eggs. This method is faster than the classic egg-based system and produces a purer final product. There are no traces of egg proteins in the final product, so it is safe for people with egg allergies.

== Previous seasonal vaccine production ==
Prior to the H1N1/09 outbreak, WHO recommended that vaccines for the Northern Hemisphere's 2009–2010 flu season contain an A(H1N1)-like virus, and stocks were made available. However, the strain of H1N1 in the seasonal flu vaccine was different from the pandemic strain H1N1/09 and offered no immunity against it. The US Centers for Disease Control and Prevention (CDC) characterized over 80 new H1N1 viruses that may be used in a vaccine.

== Production questions and decisions ==
=== Questions ===
There was concern in mid-2009 that, should a second, deadlier wave of this new H1N1 strain appear during the northern autumn of 2009, producing pandemic vaccines ahead of time could turn out to be a serious waste of resources as the vaccine might not be effective against it, and there would also be a shortage of seasonal flu vaccine available if production facilities were switched to the new vaccine. Seasonal flu vaccine was being made as of May 2009. Although vaccine makers would be ready to switch to making a swine flu vaccine, many questions remained unanswered, including: "Should we really make a swine flu vaccine? Should we base a vaccine on the current virus, since flu viruses change rapidly? Vaccine against the current virus might be far less effective against a changed virus – should we wait to see if the virus changes? If vaccine production doesn't start soon, swine flu vaccine won't be ready when it's needed."

The costs of producing a vaccine also became an issue, with some U.S. lawmakers questioning whether a new vaccine was worth the unknown benefits. Representatives Phil Gingrey and Paul Broun, for instance, were not convinced that the U.S. should spend up to US$2 billion to produce one, with Gingrey stating "We can't let all of our spending and our reaction be media-driven in responding to a panic so that we don't get Katrina-ed. ... It's important because what we are talking about as we discuss the appropriateness of spending $2 billion to produce a vaccine that may never be used – that is a very important decision that our country has to make." In fact, a Fairleigh Dickinson University PublicMind poll found in October 2009 that a majority (62%) of New Jerseyans were not planning on getting the vaccine at all.

Before the pandemic was declared, the WHO said that if a pandemic was declared it would attempt to make sure that a substantial amount of vaccine was available for the benefit of developing countries. Vaccine makers and countries with standing orders, such as the U.S. and a number of European countries, would be asked, according to WHO officials, "to share with developing countries from the moment the first batches are ready if an H1N1 vaccine is made" for a pandemic strain. The global body stated that it wanted companies to donate at least 10% of their production or offer reduced prices for poor countries that could otherwise be left without vaccines if there is a sudden surge in demand.

=== Production timelines ===
After a meeting with the WHO on 14 May 2009, pharmaceutical companies said they were ready to begin making a swine flu vaccine. According to news reports, the WHO's experts would present recommendations to WHO Director-General Margaret Chan, who was expected to issue advice to vaccine manufacturers and the Sixty-second World Health Assembly. WHO's Keiji Fukuda told reporters "These are enormously complicated questions, and they are not something that anyone can make in a single meeting." Most flu vaccine companies can not make both seasonal flu vaccine and pandemic flu vaccine at the same time. Production takes months and it is impossible to switch halfway through if health officials make a mistake. If the swine flu mutates, scientists aren't sure how effective a vaccine made now from the current strain will remain. Rather than wait on the WHO decision, however, some countries in Europe have decided to go ahead with early vaccine orders.

On 20 May 2009, AP reported: "Manufacturers won't be able to start making the [swine flu] vaccine until mid-July at the earliest, weeks later than previous predictions, according to an expert panel convened by WHO. It will then take months to produce the vaccine in large quantities. The swine flu virus is not growing very fast in laboratories, making it difficult for scientists to get the key ingredient they need for a vaccine, the 'seed stock' from the virus [...] In any case, mass producing a pandemic vaccine would be a gamble, as it would take away manufacturing capacity for the seasonal flu vaccine for the flu that kills up to 500,000 people each year. Some experts have wondered whether the world really needs a vaccine for an illness that so far appears mild."

Another option proposed by the CDC was an "earlier rollout of seasonal vaccine," according to the CDC's Daniel Jernigan. He said the CDC would work with vaccine manufacturers and experts to see if that would be possible and desirable. Flu vaccination usually starts in September in the United States and peaks in November. Some vaccine experts agree it would be better to launch a second round of vaccinations against the new H1N1 strain instead of trying to add it to the seasonal flu vaccine or replacing one of its three components with the new H1N1 virus.

The Australian company CSL said that they were developing a vaccine for the swine flu and predicted that a suitable vaccine would be ready by August. However, John Sterling, Editor in Chief of Genetic Engineering & Biotechnology News, said on 2 June, "It can take five or six months to come up with an entirely novel influenza vaccine. There is a great deal of hope that biotech and pharma companies might be able to have something ready sooner."

As of September 2009, a vaccine for H1N1/09 was expected to be available starting in November 2009, with production of three billion doses per year. It was expected that two doses would be needed to provide sufficient protection, but tests indicated that one dose would be sufficient for adults.

As of 28 September 2009, GlaxoSmithKline produced a vaccine made by growing the virus in hens' eggs, then breaking and deactivating the virus, and Baxter International produced a vaccine made in cell culture, suitable for those who have an egg allergy. The vaccines have been approved for use in the European Union.

=== Testing ===
Initial Phase I human testing began with Novartis' MF59 candidate in July 2009, at which time phase II trials of CSL's candidate CSL425 vaccine were planned to start in August 2009, but had not begun recruiting. Sanofi Pasteur's candidate inactivated H1N1 had several phase II trials planned as of 21 July 2009, but had not begun recruiting.

News coverage conflicted with this information, as Australian trials of the CSL candidate were announced as having started on 21 July, and the Chinese government announced the start of trials of the Hualan Biological Engineering candidate.

In July 2009, Omninvest in Hungary, in a randomized-controlled trial, began testing Fluval P, a whole virion, aluminum adjuvanted pandemic influenza H1N1 vaccine, which was found to be safe and effective, when administered alone, or together with the seasonal influenza vaccine.

Pandemrix, made by GlaxoSmithKline (GSK), and Focetria, made by Novartis were approved by the European Medicines Agency on 25 September 2009, and Celvapan, made by Baxter was approved the following week. The first comparative clinical study of both vaccines started on children in the United Kingdom on 25 September 2009. GSK announced results from clinical trials assessing the use of Pandemrix in children, adults, and the elderly. A 2009 trial examined the safety and efficacy of two different doses of the split-virus vaccine, and was published in The New England Journal of Medicine. The vaccine used in the trial was prepared by CSL Biotherapies in chicken eggs, in the same way as the seasonal vaccine. A robust immune response was produced in over 90% of patients after a single dose of either 15 or 30 μg of antigen. This study suggested that the current recommendation for two doses of vaccine are overkill and that a single dose is quite sufficient.

Arepanrix, an AS03-Adjuvanted H1N1 Pandemic Influenza Vaccine similar to Pandemrix and also made by GSK, was authorized by Canada's Minister of Health on 21 October 2009.

== Adverse events ==
A review by the U.S. National Institutes of Health (NIH) concluded that the 2009 H1N1 ("swine flu") vaccine has a safety profile similar to that of seasonal vaccine.

In an initial clinical trial in Australia, non-serious adverse events were reported by about half of the 240 people vaccinated, with these events including tenderness and pain at the site of injection, headache, malaise, and muscle pain. Two people had more severe events, with a much longer spell of nausea, muscle pain and malaise that lasted several days. The authors stated that the frequency and severity of these adverse events were similar to those normally seen with seasonal influenza vaccines. A second trial involved 2,200 people ranging from 3 to 77 years of age. In this study no patients reported serious adverse events, with the most commonly observed events being pain at the injection site and fever, which occurred in 10–25% of people. Although this trial followed up patients individually, the Government has been criticized for relying on voluntary reporting for post-vaccination evaluation in other circumstances, since this is "unlikely to accurately measure the percentage of people who get adverse effect".

As of 19 November 2009, the World Health Organization (WHO) said that 65 million doses of vaccine had been administered and that it had a similar safety profile to the seasonal flu vaccine, with no significant differences in the adverse events produced by the different types of vaccine. There has been one report of an adverse event per 10,000 doses of vaccine, with only five percent of these adverse events being serious, an overall rate of serious events of one in 200,000 doses.

In Canada, after 6.6 million doses of vaccine had been distributed between 21 October and 7 November, there were reports of mild adverse events in 598 people vaccinated including: nausea, dizziness, headache, fever, vomiting, and swelling or soreness at the injection site. There were reports of tingling lips or tongue, difficulty breathing, hives, and skin rashes. Thirty six people had serious adverse events, including anaphylaxis and febrile convulsions. The rate of serious adverse events is one in 200,000 doses distributed, which according to Canada's chief public health officer, is less than expected for the seasonal flu vaccine. GlaxoSmithKline recalled a batch of vaccine in Canada after it appeared to cause higher rates of adverse events than other batches.

In the US, 46 million doses had been distributed as of 20 November 2009, and 3182 adverse events were reported. The CDC stated that the "vast majority" were mild, with about one serious adverse event in 260,000 doses.

In Japan, around 15 million people had been vaccinated by 31 December 2009. 1,900 cases of side effects and 104 cases of death were reported from medical institutions. The health ministry announced that it will conduct epidemiologic investigation.

In France, around five million people had been vaccinated by 30 December 2009. 2,657 cases of side effects, eight cases of intrauterine death and five cases of miscarriages were reported after vaccination by afssaps.

Rare potential adverse events are temporary bleeding disorders and Guillain–Barré syndrome (GBS), a serious condition involving the peripheral nervous system, from which most patients recover fully within a few months to a year. Some studies have indicated that influenza-like illness is itself associated with an increased risk of GBS, suggesting that vaccination might indirectly protect against the disorder by protecting against flu. According to Marie-Paule Kieny of WHO assessing the side-effects of large-scale influenza vaccination is complicated by the fact that in any large population a few people will become ill and die at any time. For example, in any six-week period in the UK six sudden deaths from unknown causes and 22 cases of Guillain–Barré syndrome would be expected, so if everyone in the UK were vaccinated, this background rate of illness and death would continue as normal and some people would die simply by chance soon after the vaccination.

Some scientists have reported concerns about the longer-term effects of the vaccine. For instance, Sucharit Bhakdi, professor of medical microbiology at the Johannes Gutenberg University of Mainz in Germany, wrote in the journal, Medical Microbiology and Immunology, of the possibility that immune stimulation by vaccines or any other cause might worsen pre-existing heart disease. Chris Shaw, a neuroscientist at the University of British Columbia, expressed concern that serious side-effects may not appear immediately; he said it took five to ten years to see most of the Gulf War syndrome outcomes.

The CDC states that most studies on modern influenza vaccines have seen no link with GBS, Although one review gives an incidence of about one case per million vaccinations, a large study in China, reported in The New England Journal of Medicine covering close to 100 million doses of H1N1 flu vaccine found only eleven cases of Guillain–Barré syndrome, actually lower than the normal rate of the disease in China, and no other notable side effects.

=== Pregnant women and children ===
A 2009 review of the use of influenza vaccines in pregnant women stated that influenza infections posed a major risk during pregnancy and that multiple studies had shown that the inactivated vaccine was safe in pregnant women, concluding that this vaccine "can be safely and effectively administered during any trimester of pregnancy" and that high levels of immunization would avert "a significant number of deaths". A 2004 review of the safety of influenza vaccines in children stated that the live vaccine had been shown to be safe but that it might trigger wheezing in some children with asthma; less data for the trivalent inactivated vaccine was available, but no serious symptoms had been seen in clinical trials.

=== Squalene ===
Newsweek states that "wild rumours" about the swine flu vaccine are being spread through e-mails, it writes that "The claims are nearly pure bunk, with only trace amounts of fact." These rumours generally make unfounded claims that the vaccine is dangerous and they may also promote conspiracy theories. For example, Newsweek states that some chain e-mails make false claims about squalene (shark liver oil) in vaccines. The New York Times also notes that anti-vaccine groups have spread "dire warnings" about formulations of the vaccine that contain squalene as an adjuvant. An adjuvant is a substance that boosts the body's immune response, thereby stretching the supply of the vaccine and helping immunize elderly people with a weak immune system. Squalene is a normal part of the human body, made in the liver and circulating in the blood, and is also found in many foods, such as eggs and olive oil. None of the formulations of vaccine used in the US contain squalene, or any other adjuvant. However, some European and Canadian formulations do contain 25 μg of squalene per dose, which is roughly the amount found in a drop of olive oil. Some animal experiments have suggested that squalene might be linked to autoimmune disorders. although others suggest squalene might protect people against cancer.

Squalene-based adjuvants have been used in European influenza vaccines since 1997, with about 22 million doses administered over the past twelve years. The WHO states that no severe side effects have been associated with these vaccines, although they can produce mild inflammation at the site of injection. The safety of squalene-containing influenza vaccines have also been tested in two separate clinical trials, one with healthy non-elderly people, and one with elderly people, in both trials the vaccine was safe and well tolerated, with only weak side-effects, such as mild pain at the injection site. A 2009 meta-analysis brought together data from 64 clinical trials of influenza vaccines with the squalene-containing adjuvant MF59 and compared them to the effects of vaccines with no adjuvant. The analysis reported that the adjuvanted vaccines were associated with slightly lower risks of chronic diseases, but that neither type of vaccines altered the normal rate of autoimmune diseases; the authors concluded that their data "supports the good safety profile associated with MF59-adjuvanted influenza vaccines and suggests there may be a clinical benefit over non-MF59-containing vaccines". A 2004 review of the effects of adjuvants on mice and humans concluded that "despite numerous case reports on vaccination induced autoimmunity, most epidemiological studies failed to confirm the association and the risk appears to be extremely low or non-existent", although the authors noted that the possibility that adjuvants might cause damaging immune reactions in a few susceptible people has not been completely ruled out. A 2009 review of oil-based adjuvants in influenza vaccines stated that this type of adjuvant "neither stimulates antibodies against squalene oil naturally produced by the humans body nor enhances titers of preexisting antibodies to squalene" and that these formulations did not raise any safety concerns.

A paper published in 2000 suggested that squalene might have caused of Gulf War syndrome by producing anti-squalene antibodies, although other scientists stated that it was uncertain if the methods used were actually capable of detecting these antibodies. A 2009 U.S. Department of Defense study comparing healthy Navy personnel to those suffering from Gulf War syndrome was published in the journal Vaccine, this used a validated test for these antibodies and found no link between the presence of the antibodies and illness, with about half of both groups having these antibodies and no correlation between symptoms and antibodies. Furthermore, none of the vaccines given to US troops during the Gulf war actually contained any squalene adjuvants.

=== Thiomersal ===
Multi-dose versions of the vaccine contain the preservative thiomersal (also known as thimerosal), a mercury compound that prevents contamination when the vial is used repeatedly. Single-dose versions and the live vaccine do not contain this preservative. In the U.S., one dose from a multi-dose vial contains approximately 25 micrograms of mercury, a bit less than a typical tuna fish sandwich. (The comparison of the injected and ingested quantities is for reference only, since the rate of absorption of ingested elemental mercury into the bloodstream is less than 0.01%.) In Canada, different variants contain five and 50 micrograms of thimerosal per dose. The use of thiomersal has been controversial, with claims that it can cause autism and other developmental disorders. The U.S. Institute of Medicine examined these claims and concluded in 2004 that the evidence did not support any link between vaccines and autism.

Other reviews came to similar conclusions, with a 2006 review in the Canadian Journal of Neurological Sciences stating that there is no convincing evidence to support the claim that thimerosal has a causal role in autism, and a 2009 review in the journal Clinical Infectious Diseases stating that claims that mercury can cause autism are "biologically implausible". The U.K. National Health Service stated in 2003 that "There is no evidence of long-term adverse effects due to the exposure levels of thiomersal in vaccines." The World Health Organization concluded that there is "no evidence of toxicity in infants, children or adults exposed to thiomersal in vaccines". In 2008 a review noted that even though thiomersal was removed from all US childhood vaccines in 2001, this has not changed the number of autism diagnoses, which are still increasing.

=== Dystonia ===
According to the CDC, there is no evidence either for or against dystonia being caused by the vaccinations. Dystonia is extremely rare. Due to the very low numbers of cases, dystonia is poorly understood. There were only five cases noted that might have been associated with influenza vaccinations over a span of eighteen years. In one discredited case, a woman wrongly blamed difficulties with movement and speech on a seasonal influenza vaccination. The Dystonia Medical Research Foundation stated that it is unlikely that the symptoms in this case were actually dystonia and stated that there has "never been a validated case of dystonia resulting from a flu shot". A vaccine court special master concluded that the woman's symptoms weren't from the vaccine. Additionally, the woman later said that Jenny McCarthy's anti-vaccine group Generation Rescue had "commandeered my injury to turn it into a poster story for their cause against vaccines."

=== Children vaccine recall ===
On 15 December 2009, one of the five manufacturers supplying the H1N1 vaccine to the United States recalled thousands of doses because they were not as potent as expected. The French manufacturer Sanofi Pasteur voluntarily recalled about 800,000 doses of vaccine meant for children between the ages of six months and 35 months. The company and the Centers for Disease Control and Prevention (CDC) emphasized that the recall was not prompted by safety concerns, and that even though the vaccine is not quite as potent as it is supposed to be, children who received it do not need to be immunized again. The CDC emphasized that there is no danger for any child who received the recalled vaccine. When asked what parents should do, CDC spokesman Tom Skinner said, "absolutely nothing." He said if children receive this vaccine, they will be fine.

=== Narcolepsy in Finland and Sweden ===
In 2010, The Swedish Medical Products Agency (MPA) and The Finnish National Institute for Health and Welfare (THL) received reports from Swedish and Finnish health care professionals regarding narcolepsy as suspected adverse reaction following Pandemrix flu vaccination. The reports concern children aged 12–16 years where symptoms compatible with narcolepsy, diagnosed after thorough medical investigation, have occurred one to two months after vaccination.

THL concluded in February 2011 that there is a clear connection between the Pandemrix vaccination campaign of 2009 and 2010 and narcolepsy epidemic in Finland: there was a nine times higher probability to get narcolepsy with vaccination than without it.

At the end of March 2011, an MPA press release stated: "Results from a Swedish registry based cohort study indicate a 4-fold increased risk of narcolepsy in children and adolescents below the age of 20 vaccinated with Pandemrix, compared to children of the same age that were not vaccinated." The same study found no increased risk in adults who were vaccinated with Pandemrix.

== Availability ==
=== Centers for Disease Control and Prevention ===
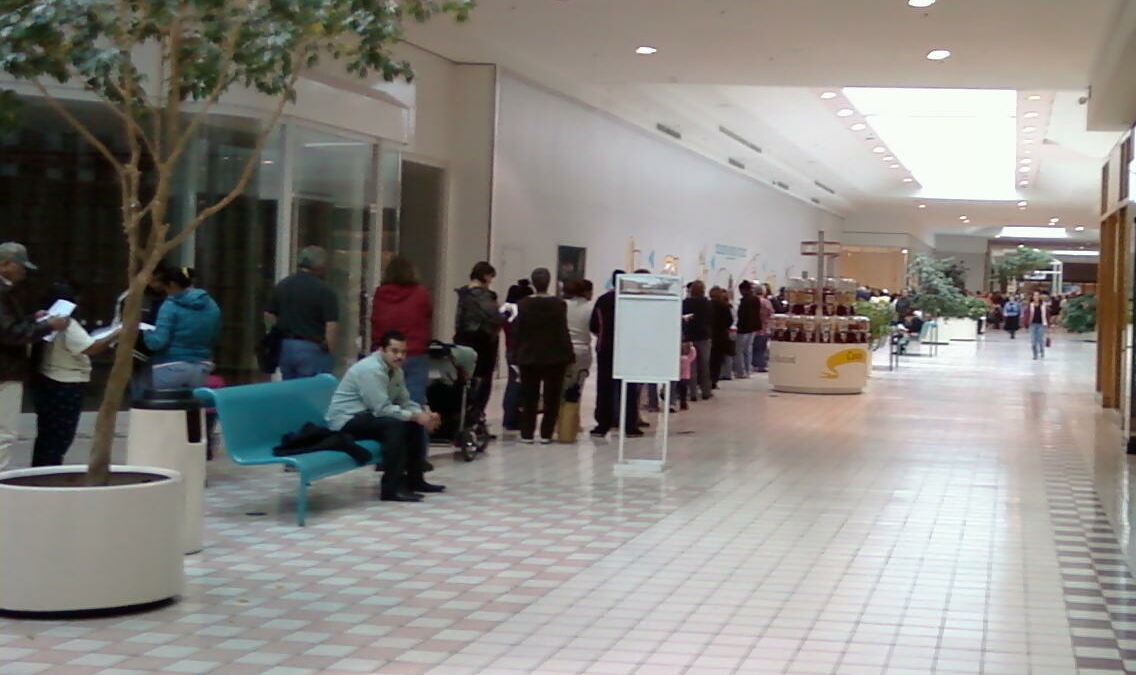
2,500 people line up in a mall in Texas City, Texas to receive the H1N1 vaccine from the Galveston County Health Department on 30 October 2009.

The American Centers for Disease Control and Prevention issued the following recommendations on who should be vaccinated (order is not in priority):

- Pregnant women, because they are at higher risk of complications and can potentially provide protection to infants who cannot be vaccinated;
- Household contacts and caregivers for children younger than 6 months of age, because younger infants are at higher risk of influenza-related complications and cannot be vaccinated. Vaccination of those in close contact with infants younger than 6 months old might help protect infants by "cocooning" them from the virus;
- Healthcare and emergency medical services personnel, because infections among healthcare workers have been reported and this can be a potential source of infection for vulnerable patients. Also, increased absenteeism in this population could reduce healthcare system capacity;
- All people from 6 months through 24 years of age:
  - Children from 6 months through 18 years of age, because cases of 2009 H1N1 influenza have been seen in children who are in close contact with each other in school and day care settings, which increases the likelihood of disease spread, and
  - Young adults 19 through 24 years of age, because many cases of 2009 H1N1 influenza have been seen in these healthy young adults and they often live, work, and study in close proximity, and they are a frequently mobile population; and,
- Persons aged 25 through 64 years who have health conditions associated with higher risk of medical complications from influenza.
- Once the demand for these groups has been met at a local level, everyone from the ages of 25 through 64 years should be vaccinated too.

In addition, the CDC recommends:

Children through 9 years of age should get two doses of vaccine, about a month apart. Older children and adults need only one dose.

=== National Health Service ===
The UK's National Health Service policy is to provide vaccine in this order of priority:

- People aged between six months and 65 years with:
  - chronic lung disease;
  - chronic heart disease;
  - chronic kidney disease;
  - chronic liver disease;
  - chronic neurological disease;
  - diabetes; or
  - suppressed immune system, whether due to disease or treatment.
- All pregnant women.
- People who live with someone whose immune system is compromised (for example, people with cancer or HIV/AIDS).
- People aged 65 and over in the seasonal flu vaccine at-risk groups.

This excludes the large majority of individuals aged six months to 24 years, a group for which the CDC recommends vaccination.

The NHS notes that:

- Healthy people over 65 years of age seem to have some natural immunity.
- Children, while disproportionately affected, tend to make full recoveries.
- The vaccine is ineffective in young infants.

The United Kingdom began its administration program 21 October 2009. UK Soldiers serving in Afghanistan will also be offered vaccination.

By April 2010, it was apparent that most of the vaccine was not needed. The US government had bought 229 million doses of H1N1 vaccines of which 91 million doses were used; of the surplus, 5 million doses were stored in bulk, 15 million doses were sent to developing countries and 71 million doses were destroyed. The World Health Organization is planning to examine if it overreacted to the H1N1 outbreak.

== Political issues ==
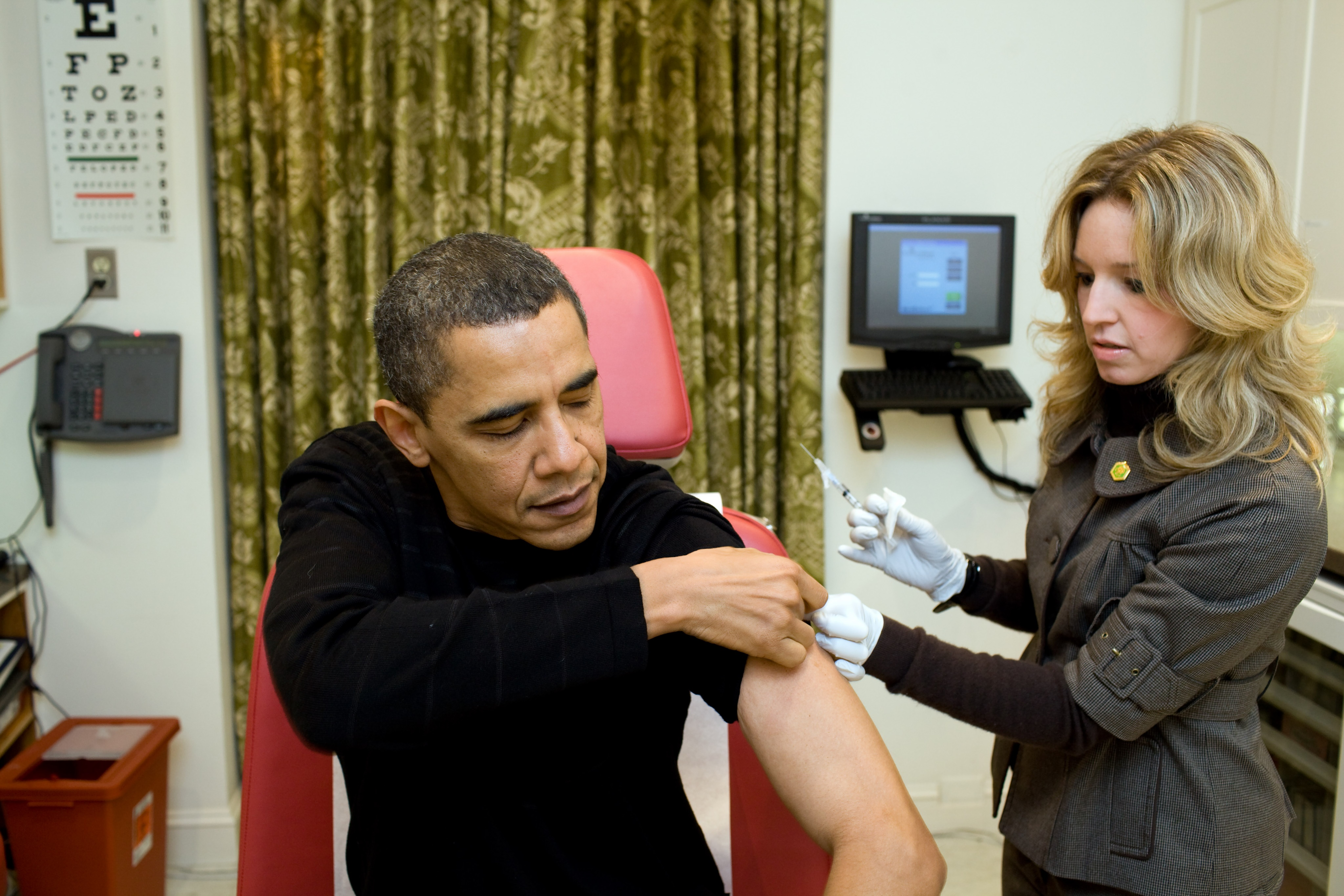
US President Barack Obama receives the vaccine on 20 December 2009

General political issues, not restricted to the 2009 outbreak, arose regarding the distribution of vaccine. In many countries supplies are controlled by national or local governments, and the question of how the vaccine will be allocated should there be an insufficient supply for everyone is critical, and will likely depend on the patterns of any pandemic, and the age groups most at risk for serious complications, including death. In the case of a lethal pandemic people will be demanding access to the vaccine and the major problem will be making it available to those who need it.

While it has been suggested that compulsory vaccination may be needed to control a pandemic, many countries do not have a legal framework that would allow this. The only populations easily compelled to accept vaccination are military personnel (who can be given routine vaccinations as part of their service obligations), health care personnel (who can be required to be vaccinated to protect patients), and school children, who (under United States constitutional law) could be required to be vaccinated as a condition of attending school.

== See also ==
- 2009 swine flu pandemic
- COVID-19 vaccine
- Immunologic adjuvant
