= AS04 =

Combination of adjuvants

Adjuvant System 04 or AS04 is a trade name for a combination of adjuvants used in various vaccine products by GlaxoSmithKline, in particular the Fendrix hepatitis B vaccine and Cervarix human papillomavirus (HPV) vaccine. It consists of aluminium hydroxide and monophosphoryl lipid A (MPL). It is the successor of AS03, a squalene based adjuvant used in H1N1/09 and H5N1 influenza vaccines.

== Efficacy and safety ==
=== HPV vaccines ===
Studies on an AS04-adjuvanted HPV-16/18 vaccine showed a high and sustained immune response to HPV antigens after injection, including in patients receiving subsequent doses. Immune response was enhanced by the MPL component which triggered local NF-kB and cytokine production, leading to increased activation of antigen-presenting cells. Immune response duration was extended by the aluminium hydroxide component. The HPV-16/18 AS04-adjuvanted vaccine showed enhanced efficacy compared to an aluminium salt-adjuvanted formulation, with a higher level of antibodies subsequently detected in the body.

Long-term studies appear to show an adequate efficacy and safety profile.

=== Hepatitis B vaccines ===
AS04-adjuvanted HBV vaccines may be relevant for patients that are non-responsive to other HBV vaccines, including those with immunodeficiency.

== See also ==
- AS03
- HPV vaccine
- Hepatitis B vaccine
