= Pandemrix =

Flu vaccine

Vaccine description
- Target: Pandemic H1N1/09 virus
- Vaccine type: Inactivated

Clinical data
- Routes of administration: Intramuscular injection
- ATC code: J07BB02 (WHO)

Legal status
- Legal status: UK: P (Pharmacy medicines); EU: Rx-only

Identifiers
- CAS Number: 1385778-30-2
- ChemSpider: none

Pandemrix is an influenza vaccine for influenza pandemics, such as the 2009 flu pandemic. The vaccine was developed by GlaxoSmithKline (GSK) and patented in September 2006.

The vaccine was one of the H1N1 vaccines approved for use by the European Commission in September 2009, upon the recommendations of the European Medicines Agency (EMEA). The vaccine is only approved for use when an H1N1 influenza pandemic has been officially declared by the World Health Organization (WHO) or European Union (EU). The vaccine was initially developed as a pandemic mock-up vaccine using an H5N1 strain.

Pandemrix was found to be associated with an increased risk of narcolepsy following investigations by Swedish and Finnish health authorities and had higher rates of adverse events than other vaccines for H1N1. This resulted in several legal cases. Stanford University studies suggested that narcolepsy is an autoimmune disease and that it appears to be triggered by upper airway respiratory infections.

In 2018, a study team including Centers for Disease Control and Prevention (CDC) scientists analyzed and published vaccine safety data on adjuvanted pH1N1 vaccines (arenaprix-AS03, Focetria-MF59, and Pandemrix-AS03) from 10 global study sites. Researchers did not detect any associations between the vaccines and narcolepsy.

== Constituents ==
As well as the active antigen derived from A/California/7/2009 (H1N1), the vaccine contains an immunologic adjuvant AS03 which consists of DL-α-tocopherol (vitamin E), squalene and polysorbate 80.

Thiomersal (thimerosal) is added as a preservative. Being manufactured in chicken eggs, it contains trace amounts of egg proteins. Additional important non-medicinal ingredients are formaldehyde, sodium deoxycholate, and sucrose.

=== Use of adjuvant ===
While other 2009 H1N1 vaccines have been developed, the use of a proprietary immunologic adjuvant is claimed to boost the potency of the body's immune response, meaning that only a quarter of the inactivated virus is needed.

Professor David Salisbury, Head of Immunisation at the UK Department of Health said the vaccines with adjuvants offer good protection even if the virus changes over time; "One of the advantages with adjuvanted vaccines is their ability to protect against drifted (mutated) strains. It opens the door for a whole new strategy in dealing with flu."

== Dosage ==
The vaccine is supplied in separate vials, one containing the adjuvant, and the other the inactivated virus, which require mixing before intramuscular injection. Originally it was thought that two doses given 21 days apart would be required for full efficacy. Subsequent testing has allowed the UK programme to consist of just a single dose for most people, with a two-dose schedule for children under the age of 10 years and immunocompromised adults.

== Availability ==
Pandemrix was given to around 70 million individuals, including 31 million Europeans following the 2009 swine flu pandemic.

The Marketing Authorisation from the European Medicines Agency expired in August 2015 when GSK Biologicals did not apply for renewal of it citing lack of demand for the vaccine.

== Clinical trials ==
The EMEA reported results from some clinical trials in the CHMP Assessment Report. These relate to vaccination against H5N1 (Bird Flu) and not H1N1 (Swine Flu).

- H5N1-007 was initiated at a single site in Belgium (Ghent) in March 2006.
- H5N1-008 was initiated at 41 sites in seven countries (6 EU MS plus Russia) in May 2006.
- H5N1-002 was initiated on 24 March 2007 in four SE Asian countries.

GlaxoSmithKline reported results from the second clinical trial, from the pediatric clinical trial, and the response from the elderly population.

== Side effects ==
According to GlaxoSmithKline's Patient Information Leaflet, the following side effects may occur (sorted by rate of occurrence):

- Very common
  - Headache
  - Tiredness
  - Pain, redness, swelling or a hard lump at the injection site
  - Fever
  - Aching muscles, joint pain
- Common
  - Warmth, itching or bruising at the injection site
  - Increased sweating, shivering, flu-like symptoms
  - Swollen glands in the neck, armpit or groin
- Uncommon
  - Tingling or numbness of the hands or feet
  - General constitutional upset of sleepiness or sleeplessness, generally feeling unwell, dizziness.
  - Diarrhea, vomiting, stomach pain, feeling sick
  - Skin reactions of itching, rash or urticaria (hives)
- Rare
  - Serious generalised allergic reactions of anaphylaxis
  - Fits
  - Severe stabbing or throbbing pain along one or more nerves
  - Low blood platelet count which can result in bleeding or bruising
- Very Rare
  - Vasculitis
  - Neurological disorders such as encephalomyelitis, neuritis or Guillain–Barré syndrome temporary paralysis

== Adverse outcomes ==
=== Narcolepsy ===
Pandemrix was found to be associated with narcolepsy from observational studies, increasing the risk of narcolepsy by 5-14 times in children and 2-7 times in adults. The increased risk of narcolepsy due to vaccination in children and adolescents was around 1 incident per 18,400 doses. In 2018, it was demonstrated that T-cells stimulated by Pandemrix were cross-reactive by molecular mimicry with part of the hypocretin peptide, the loss of which is associated with type I narcolepsy.

The British Medical Journal (BMJ) obtained adverse event report data from GSK and conducted an analysis of that data, which showed that Pandemrix was associated with adverse events much more frequently than the two other GSK H1N1 vaccines. The risk of adverse events after Pandemrix was more than five times higher than the risk after the other two GSK H1N1 vaccines. Vaccination had continued after the figures that allowed this analysis became available. In the Irish parliament, TD Clare Daly commented that, “The Health Service Executive (HSE) decided to purchase Pandemrix and continued to distribute it even after they knew it was dangerous and untested, and before most of the public in Ireland received it.”

There were multiple legal cases by individuals who attributed medical conditions to the Pandemrix vaccination. One well known example was the case of Katie Clack, a nurse who committed suicide after developing narcolepsy after receiving a vaccination. Clack was required to be vaccinated against her wishes in order to continue her job as a nurse.

In August 2010, The Swedish Medical Products Agency (MPA) and The Finnish National Institute for Health and Welfare (THL) launched investigations regarding the development of narcolepsy as a possible side effect to Pandemrix flu vaccination in children.

In summer 2010, the MPA and THL received reports from Swedish and Finnish healthcare professionals that narcolepsy was a suspected adverse drug reaction to the Pandemrix flu vaccination. The reports concern children 12 to 16 years old, whose symptoms occurred one to two months after vaccination. The symptoms were later confirmed to be compatible with narcolepsy. Consumer reports describing similar symptoms were also received. Both organizations, in consultation with external experts, have assessed the possible relationship between the vaccination and the reported reactions. MPA and THL have been in contact with other EU member states to enquire whether there have been any similar reports in other countries.

THL recommended that further Pandemrix vaccinations be discontinued pending further investigation into 15 cases of recently vaccinated children who developed narcolepsy in late 2009 and early 2010. THL later raised this figure to 17; the expected average annual occurrence is 6 cases. In Sweden, MPA has discovered 12 confirmed cases and another 12 suspected cases. Additionally, MPA says it is aware of individual case reports from France, Norway and Germany.

On 27 August 2010, the European Medicines Agency announced that the agency's Committee for Medicinal Products for Human Use would be launching a review of Pandemrix in light of the "limited number of cases" reported in Finland and Sweden, so as to "determine whether there is evidence for a causal association".

In August 2010 the Swedish MPA issued a statement which included the following: "An investigation is ongoing, but any relationship between the vaccination and the reported symptoms can not be concluded."

In February 2011, THL concluded that there is a clear connection between the Pandemrix vaccination campaign of 2009 and 2010 and the narcolepsy epidemic in Finland. The probability of developing narcolepsy was determined to be nine times higher in those who received the Pandemrix vaccination than those who didn't. A total of 152 cases of narcolepsy have been found in Finland during 2009–2010, and ninety percent of them had received the Pandemrix vaccination. Authorities believe that the number of cases may still increase.

At the end of March 2011, an MPA press release stated: "Results from a Swedish registry based cohort study indicate a 4-fold increased risk of narcolepsy in children and adolescents below the age of 20 vaccinated with Pandemrix, compared to children of the same age that were not vaccinated." The same study found no increased risk in adults who were vaccinated with Pandemrix. While cautioning that the increase in risk for children is still uncertain in magnitude, it recommends they not be vaccinated.

A study by the Stanford University School of Medicine examined the incidence of narcolepsy in relation to upper airway infection and a H1N1 vaccine (not Pandemrix) in Chinese patients. Their principal conclusion was that an increased incidence of narcolepsy was seen following a wave of upper airway infections (such as H1N1 influenza). They found no correlation between vaccination and narcolepsy. According to the authors, "the new finding of an association with infection, and not vaccination, is important as it suggests that limiting vaccination because of a fear of narcolepsy could actually increase overall risk." Since narcolepsy is now believed to be an autoimmune disease, the authors suspect that these upper airway infections trigger an immune response which leads ultimately to narcolepsy in susceptible individuals. Pandemrix contains two adjuvants designed to provoke a stronger immune response; they were not in the vaccine used in the United States or China, however.

In 2013, the New Scientist reported that "part of a surface protein on the pandemic virus looks very similar to part of a brain protein that helps keep people awake". However, the original scientific article claiming that HA protein in both the virus and the vaccine could, in some people, trigger an immune reaction against hypocretin, was retracted in 2014 because the data could not be reproduced. However, further investigations indicated that "antibodies to influenza nucleoprotein cross-react with human hypocretin receptor 2".

In 2014, a Finnish group published results that showed Pandemrix contained a higher amounts of structurally altered viral nucleoproteins than Arepanrix, a similar vaccine not associated with narcolepsy.

In 2015, it was reported that the British Department of Health was paying for sodium oxybate medication for 80 patients who are taking legal action over problems linked to the use of the swine flu vaccine, at a cost to the government of £12,000 per patient per year. Sodium oxybate is not available to patients with narcolepsy through the National Health Service.

In 2018, a multinational study including Centers for Disease Control and Prevention scientists published safety data on adjuvanted pH1N1 vaccines. Sweden was the only country where increased narcolepsy IRs were found in the period after vaccination campaigns. The ability of the researchers to evaluate the Pandemrix brand vaccine was limited.

In December 2018, T-cells were demonstrated to be cross-reactive to both a particular piece of the pandemic 2009 H1N1 virus and the amidated terminal ends of hypocretin peptides, the loss of which is associated with type I narcolepsy. Genes associated with narcolepsy modulate the expression of the specific T cell receptor recognition involved in reaction to these antigens, suggesting H1N1 infection is a cause of narcolepsy in genetically susceptible individuals. T-cells stimulated by Pandemrix were cross-reactive by molecular mimicry with the same part of the hypocretin peptide.

== See also ==
- Oseltamivir and Zanamivir – antiviral drugs used in the treatment and prophylaxis of influenza
- Influenza vaccine
- 2009 flu pandemic vaccine
