= H5N8 vaccine =

Vaccine

Vaccine description
- Target: H5N8
- Vaccine type: Inactivated

Clinical data
- Trade names: Zoonotic Influenza Vaccine Seqirus
- Routes of administration: Intramuscular
- ATC code: J07BB02 (WHO)

Legal status
- Legal status: EU: Rx-only

An H5N8 vaccine is an influenza vaccine intended to provide acquired immunity against H5 subtype influenza A viruses. It is given via Intramuscular injection.

== Zoonotic influenza vaccine Seqirus ==
Zoonotic influenza vaccine Seqirus is authorized for use in the European Union. It contains a flu strain called A/Astrakhan/3212/2020 (H5N8)-like strain (CBER-RG8A) (clade 2.3.4.4b). Zoonotic influenza vaccine Seqirus was considered to be the best candidate to provide protection against circulating H5 influenza A strains.

The most common side effects include reactions at the site of injection (swelling, pain, redness and hardening of the skin), myalgia (muscle pain), headache, tiredness, chills and feeling generally unwell.

Zoonotic Influenza Vaccine Seqirus H5N8 is indicated for active immunization against H5 subtype influenza A viruses in adults 18 years of age and older.

== Society and culture ==
The European Commission arranged for a supply of zoonotic influenza vaccine.
