= Influenza and COVID-19 vaccine =

Combination vaccine

Combination of
- Influenza vaccine: Vaccine
- COVID-19 vaccine: Vaccine

Clinical data
- ATC code: None

Legal status
- Legal status: EU: Rx-only

Influenza and COVID-19 vaccine is a combined messenger RNA vaccine (mRNA) for protection against influenza and COVID-19. It contains mRNA molecules that encode the full-length, membrane-bound hemagglutinin glycoproteins of seasonal influenza virus types A (H1N1 and H3N2) and B (Victoria lineage), as well as parts of the SARS-CoV-2 spike protein, namely the membrane-bound, linked N-terminal domain and the receptor-binding domain. It is the first combined vaccine against influenza and COVID-19.

The most common side effects include injection site pain, fatigue (tiredness), myalgia (muscle pain), arthralgia (joint pain), headache, chills, lymphadenopathy (swollen lymph nodes), nausea/vomiting, and pyrexia (fever).

Mcombriax was authorized for medical use in the European Union in April 2026.

== Medical uses ==
The combined influenza vaccine and COVID-19 vaccine is used to provide active immunization for the prevention of influenza disease caused by influenza virus subtypes A and type B; and COVID-19 caused by the SARS-CoV-2 virus.

== Society and culture ==
=== Legal status ===
In February 2026, the Committee for Medicinal Products for Human Use of the European Medicines Agency adopted a positive opinion, recommending the granting of a marketing authorization for the medicinal product Mcombriax, intended for the prevention of influenza disease and COVID-19 caused by SARS-CoV-2 in adults aged 50 years and older. Mcombriax was authorized for medical use in the European Union in April 2026.
