= Influenza vaccine =

Vaccine against influenza

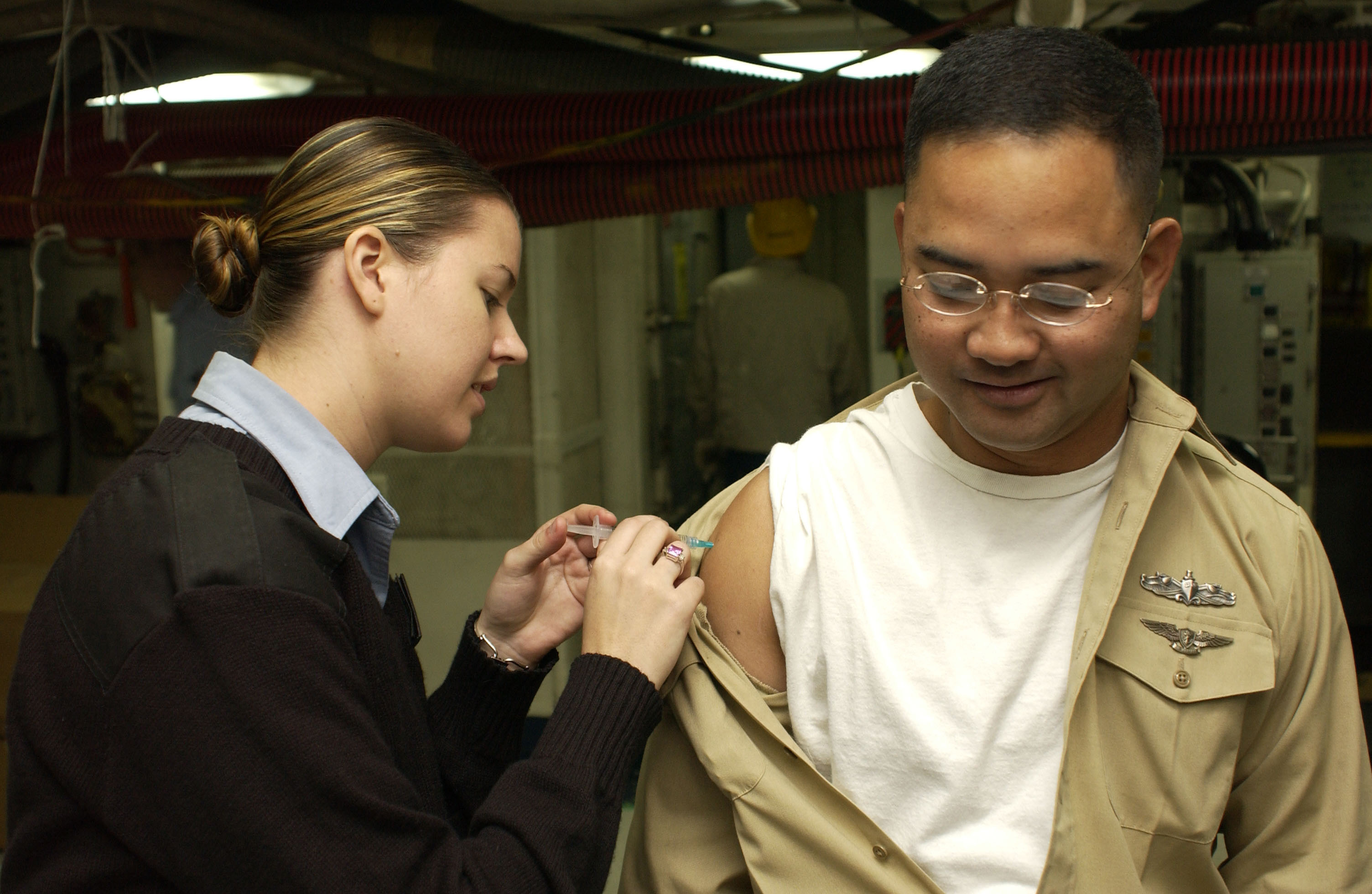
- A flu shot being given to a US Navy crew member

Vaccine description
- Target: Influenza virus (for seasonal flu: A/H1N1, A/H3N2, and B/Victoria)
- Vaccine type: inactivated, attenuated, recombinant

Clinical data
- Trade names: Afluria, Fluarix, Fluzone, others
- AHFS/Drugs.com: Inactivated: Monograph Intranasal: Monograph Recombinant: Monograph
- Pregnancy category: AU: B1or B2 (depending on vaccine brand)
- Routes of administration: Intramuscular, intranasal, intradermal
- ATC code: J07BB01 (WHO) J07BB02 (WHO), J07BB03 (WHO), J07BB04 (WHO)

Legal status
- Legal status: AU: S4 (Prescription only); CA: ℞-only / Schedule D; UK: POM (Prescription only); US: ℞-only; EU: Rx-only; In general: ℞ (Prescription only)

Identifiers
- CAS Number: 1704512-59-3
- ChemSpider: none
- KEGG: D04536

Influenza vaccines, colloquially known as flu shots or flu jabs, are vaccines that protect against infection by influenza viruses. New versions of the vaccines are developed twice a year, as the influenza virus rapidly changes. While their effectiveness varies from year to year, most provide modest to high protection against influenza. Vaccination against influenza began in the 1930s, with large-scale availability in the United States beginning in 1945.

Both the World Health Organization and the US Centers for Disease Control and Prevention (CDC) recommend yearly vaccination for nearly all people over the age of six months, especially those at high risk, and the influenza vaccine is on the World Health Organization's List of Essential Medicines. The European Centre for Disease Prevention and Control (ECDC) also recommends yearly vaccination of high-risk groups, particularly pregnant women, the elderly, children between six months and five years, and those with certain health problems.

The vaccines are generally safe, including for people who have severe egg allergies. A common side effect is soreness near the site of injection. Fever occurs in five to ten percent of children vaccinated, and temporary muscle pains or feelings of tiredness may occur. In certain years, the vaccine was linked to an increase in Guillain–Barré syndrome among older people at a rate of about one case per million doses. Influenza vaccines are not recommended in those who have had a severe allergy to previous versions of the vaccine itself. The vaccine comes in inactive and weakened viral forms. The live, weakened vaccine is generally not recommended in pregnant women, children less than two years old, adults older than 50, or people with a weakened immune system. Depending on the type it can be injected into a muscle (intramuscular), sprayed into the nose (intranasal), or injected into the middle layer of the skin (intradermal). The intradermal vaccine was not available during the 2018–2019 and 2019–2020 influenza seasons.

== History ==
Were flu vaccines available in the country

Vaccines are used in both humans and non-humans. The human vaccine is meant unless specifically identified as a veterinary, poultry, or livestock vaccine.

=== Origins and development ===
During the worldwide Spanish flu pandemic of 1918, "Pharmacists tried everything they knew, everything they had ever heard of, from the ancient art of bleeding patients, to administering oxygen, to developing new vaccines and serums (chiefly against what we call Hemophilus influenzae – a name derived from the fact that it was originally considered the etiological agent – and several types of pneumococci). Only one therapeutic measure, transfusing blood from recovered patients to new victims, showed any hint of success."

In 1931, viral growth in embryonated hens' eggs was reported by Ernest William Goodpasture and colleagues at Vanderbilt University. The work was extended to the growth of influenza virus by several workers, including Thomas Francis, Jonas Salk, Wilson Smith, and Macfarlane Burnet, leading to the first experimental influenza vaccines. In the 1940s, the US military developed the first approved inactivated vaccines for influenza, which were used during World War II. Hens' eggs continued to be used to produce virus used in influenza vaccines, but manufacturers made improvements in the purity of the virus by developing improved processes to remove egg proteins and to reduce systemic reactivity of the vaccine. In 2012, the US Food and Drug Administration (FDA) approved influenza vaccines made by growing virus in cell cultures, and influenza vaccines made from recombinant proteins were approved in 2013.

=== Acceptance ===
The egg-based technology for producing influenza vaccine was created in the 1950s. In the US swine flu scare of 1976, President Gerald Ford was confronted with a potential swine flu pandemic. The vaccination program was rushed, yet plagued by delays and public relations problems. Meanwhile, maximum military containment efforts succeeded unexpectedly in confining the new strain to the single army base where it had originated. On that base, several soldiers fell severely ill, but only one died. The program was canceled after about 24% of the population had received vaccinations. An excess in deaths of 25 over normal annual levels as well as 400 excess hospitalizations, both from Guillain–Barré syndrome, were estimated to have occurred from the vaccination program itself, demonstrating that the vaccine itself is not free of risks. A 2010 study found a significantly enhanced immune response against the 2009 pandemic H1N1 in study participants who had received vaccination against the swine flu in 1976. The 2009 H1N1 swine flu outbreak resulted in the rapid approval of pandemic influenza vaccines. Pandemrix was quickly modified to target the circulating strain and by late 2010, 70 million people had received a dose. Eight years later, the British Medical Journal (BMJ) gained access to early vaccine pharmacovigilance reports compiled by GlaxoSmithKline during the pandemic, which the BMJ reported indicated death was 5.39 times more likely with Pandemrix versus the other pandemic vaccines. However, more thorough and robust later analyses did not establish any increase of fatalities or most other serious adverse effects, with a possible rare exception for narcolepsy.

=== Quadrivalent vaccines ===
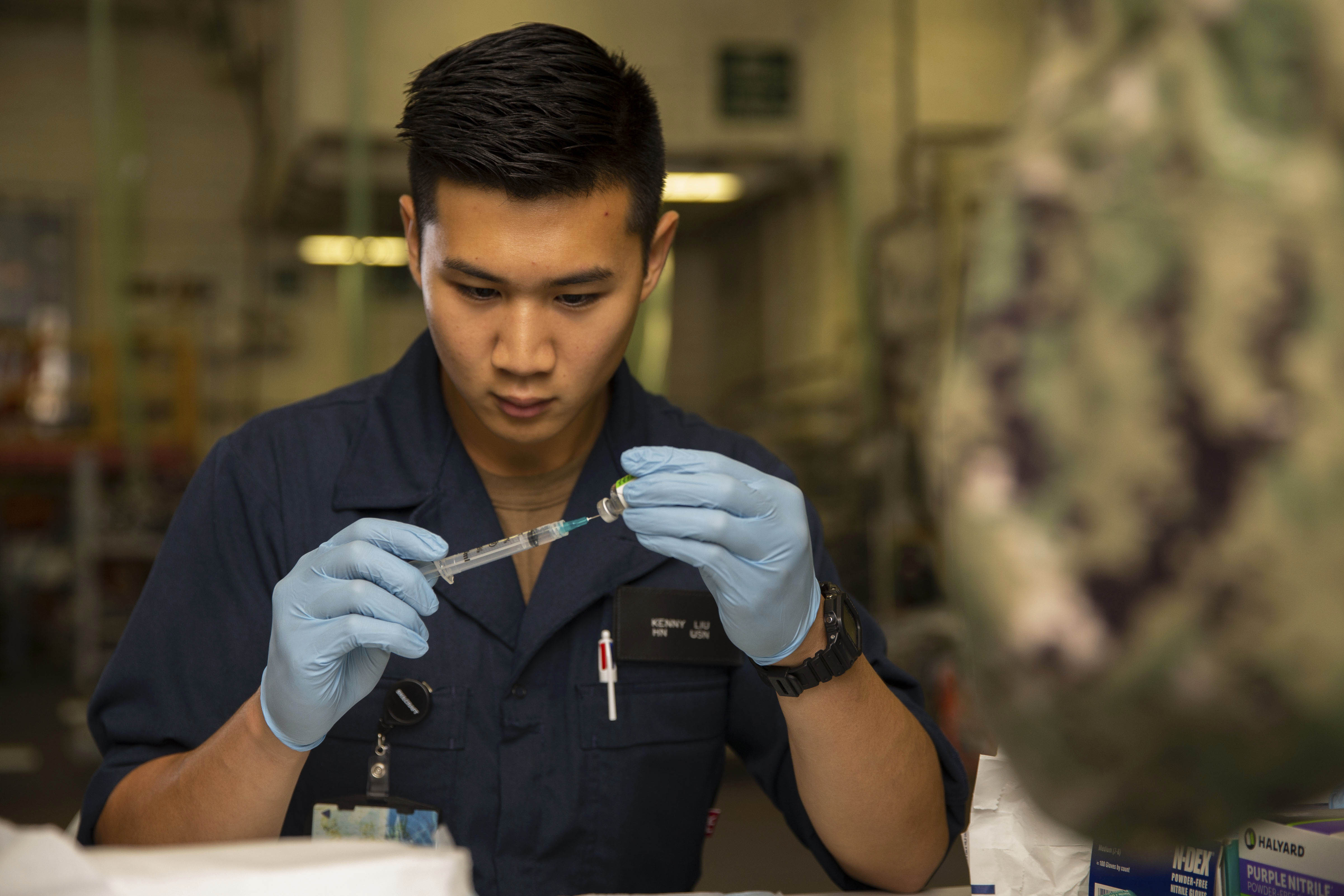
Preparation of the flu vaccine for sailors serving aboard the USS Gerald R. Ford in 2019

A quadrivalent flu vaccine administered by nasal mist was approved by the US Food and Drug Administration (FDA) in March 2012. Fluarix Quadrivalent was approved by the FDA in December 2012.

A literature review of quadrivalent influenza vaccines was published in 2014.

Starting with the 2018–2019 influenza season most of the regular-dose egg-based flu shots and all the recombinant and cell-grown flu vaccines in the United States were quadrivalent. In the 2019–2020 influenza season all regular-dose flu shots and all recombinant influenza vaccine in the United States were quadrivalent. However, as of the 2026-2027 flu vaccination year, all US-licensed vaccines returned to exclusively trivalence.

In November 2019, the FDA approved Fluzone High-Dose Quadrivalent for use in the United States starting with the 2020–2021 influenza season.

In February 2020, the FDA approved Fluad Quadrivalent for use in the United States. In July 2020, the FDA approved both Fluad and Fluad Quadrivalent for use in the United States for the 2020–2021 influenza season.

The B/Yamagata lineage of influenza B, one of the four lineages targeted by quadrivalent vaccines, might have become extinct in 2020/2021 due to COVID-19 pandemic measures, and there have been no naturally occurring cases confirmed since March 2020. In 2023, the World Health Organization concluded that protection against the Yamagata lineage was no longer necessary in the seasonal flu vaccine, so future vaccines are recommended to be trivalent instead of quadrivalent. For the 2024–2025 Northern Hemisphere influenza season, the FDA recommends removing B/Yamagata from all influenza vaccines.

=== Combination vaccines ===
A combined messenger RNA vaccine for protection against influenza and COVID-19 was introduced in 2026.

== Medical uses ==
The influenza vaccine is indicated for active immunization for the prevention of influenza disease caused by influenza virus subtypes A and type B contained in the vaccine. The US Centers for Disease Control and Prevention (CDC) recommends the flu vaccine as the best way to protect people against the flu and prevent its spread. The flu vaccine can also reduce the severity of the flu if a person contracts a strain that the vaccine did not contain. It takes about two weeks following vaccination for protective antibodies to form.

A 2012 meta-analysis found that flu vaccination was effective 67 percent of the time; the populations that benefited the most were HIV-positive adults aged 18 to 55 (76 percent), healthy adults aged 18 to 46 (approximately 70 percent), and healthy children aged six months to 24 months (66 percent). The influenza vaccine also appears to protect against myocardial infarction with a benefit of 15–45%.

=== Effectiveness ===
US vaccine effectiveness by start year:
2004	10%
2005	21%
2006	52%
2007	37%
2008	41%
2009	56%
2010	60%
2011	47%
2012	49%
2013	52%
2014	19%
2015	48%
2016	40%
2017	38%
2018	29%
2019	39%
2020	Unknown
2021	36%
2022	30%
2023	44%
2024	56%

A vaccine is assessed by its efficacy – the extent to which it reduces the risk of disease under controlled conditions – and its effectiveness – the observed reduction in risk after the vaccine is put into use. In the case of influenza, effectiveness is expected to be lower than the efficacy because it is measured using the rates of influenza-like illness, which is not always caused by influenza. Studies on the effectiveness of flu vaccines in the real world are difficult; vaccines may be imperfectly matched, virus prevalence varies widely between years, and influenza is often confused with other influenza-like illnesses. However, in most years (16 of the 19 years before 2007), the flu vaccine strains have been a good match for the circulating strains, and even a mismatched vaccine can often provide cross-protection. The virus rapidly changes due to antigenic drift, a slight mutation in the virus that causes a new strain to arise.

The effectiveness of seasonal flu vaccines varies significantly, with an estimated average efficacy of 40–60% against symptomatic disease, depending on vaccine strain, age, prior immunity, and immune function, so vaccinated people can still contract influenza. The effectiveness of flu vaccines is considered to be suboptimal, particularly among the elderly, but vaccination is still beneficial in reducing the mortality rate and hospitalization rate due to influenza as well as duration of hospitalization. Vaccination of school-age children has shown to provide indirect protection for other age groups. LAIVs are recommended for children based on superior efficacy, especially for children under 6, and greater immunity against non-vaccine strains when compared to inactivated vaccines.

From 2012 to 2015 in New Zealand, vaccine effectiveness against admission to an intensive care unit was 82%. Effectiveness against hospitalized influenza illness in the 2019–2020 United States flu season was 41% overall and 54% in people aged 65 years or older. One review found 31% effectiveness against death among adults.

Repeated annual influenza vaccination generally offers consistent year-on-year protection against influenza. There is, however, suggestive evidence that repeated vaccinations may cause a reduction in vaccine effectiveness for certain influenza subtypes, possibly related to immune imprinting, a phenomenon in which the immune system preferentially recalls responses from earlier influenza exposures. As of 2019, the CDC recommends a yearly vaccine as most studies demonstrate overall effectiveness of annual influenza vaccination.

There is not enough evidence to establish significant differences in the effectiveness of different influenza vaccine types, but there are high-dose or adjuvanted products that induce a stronger immune response in the elderly.

According to a 2016 study by faculty at the University of New South Wales, getting a flu shot was as effective or better at preventing a heart attack than even quitting smoking.

A 2024 CDC study found that the 2024 flu vaccine reduced the risk of hospitalization from the flu by 35% in the Southern Hemisphere. The research, conducted across five countries—Argentina, Brazil, Chile, Paraguay, and Uruguay—showed the vaccine was less effective than the one used in the previous season.

=== Children ===
In April 2002, the US Advisory Committee on Immunization Practices (ACIP) encouraged that all children 6 to 23 months of age be vaccinated annually against influenza. In 2010, ACIP again recommended annual influenza vaccination for those 6 months of age and older. The CDC also recommends that everyone except infants under the age of six months should receive seasonal influenza vaccine.

Vaccination campaigns usually focus special attention on people who are at high risk of serious complications if they catch the flu, such as pregnant women, children under 5 years, the elderly, and people with chronic illnesses or weakened immune systems, as well as those to whom they are exposed, such as health care workers.

Because infants under 6 months have higher relative risk of influenza complications compared to older children, the CDC and the WHO recommend that household contacts and caregivers of infants be vaccinated to reduce the risk of passing an influenza infection to the infant.

Also in healthy children, the vaccine appears to decrease the risk of influenza and possibly influenza-like illness. During the 2017–18 flu season, the CDC indicated that 85 percent of the children who died "likely will not have been vaccinated". In children under the age of two data were limited as of 2018.

In the United States, as of January 2019, the CDC recommended that children aged six through 35 months may receive either 0.25 milliliters or 0.5 milliliters per dose of Fluzone Quadrivalent. There is no preference for one or the other dose volume of Fluzone Quadrivalent for that age group. All persons 3 years of age and older should receive 0.5 milliliters per dose of Fluzone Quadrivalent. As of October 2018, Afluria Quadrivalent is licensed for children six months of age and older in the United States. Children six months through 35 months of age should receive 0.25 milliliters for each dose of Afluria Quadrivalent. All persons 36 months of age and older should receive 0.5 milliliters per dose of Afluria Quadrivalent. For those not previously vaccinated or an unknown influenza vaccination history 2 doses are recommended, 4 weeks apart.

As of February 2018, in Canada Afluria Tetra was only licensed for adults and children five years of age and older.

In 2014, the Canadian National Advisory Committee on Immunization (NACI)had published a review of influenza vaccination in healthy 5–18-year-olds, and in 2015, published a review of the use of pediatric Fluad in children 6–72 months of age. In one study, conducted in a tertiary referral center, the rate of influenza vaccination in children was only 31%. Higher rates were found among immunosuppressed children (46%) and in children with inflammatory bowel disease (50%).

=== Adults ===
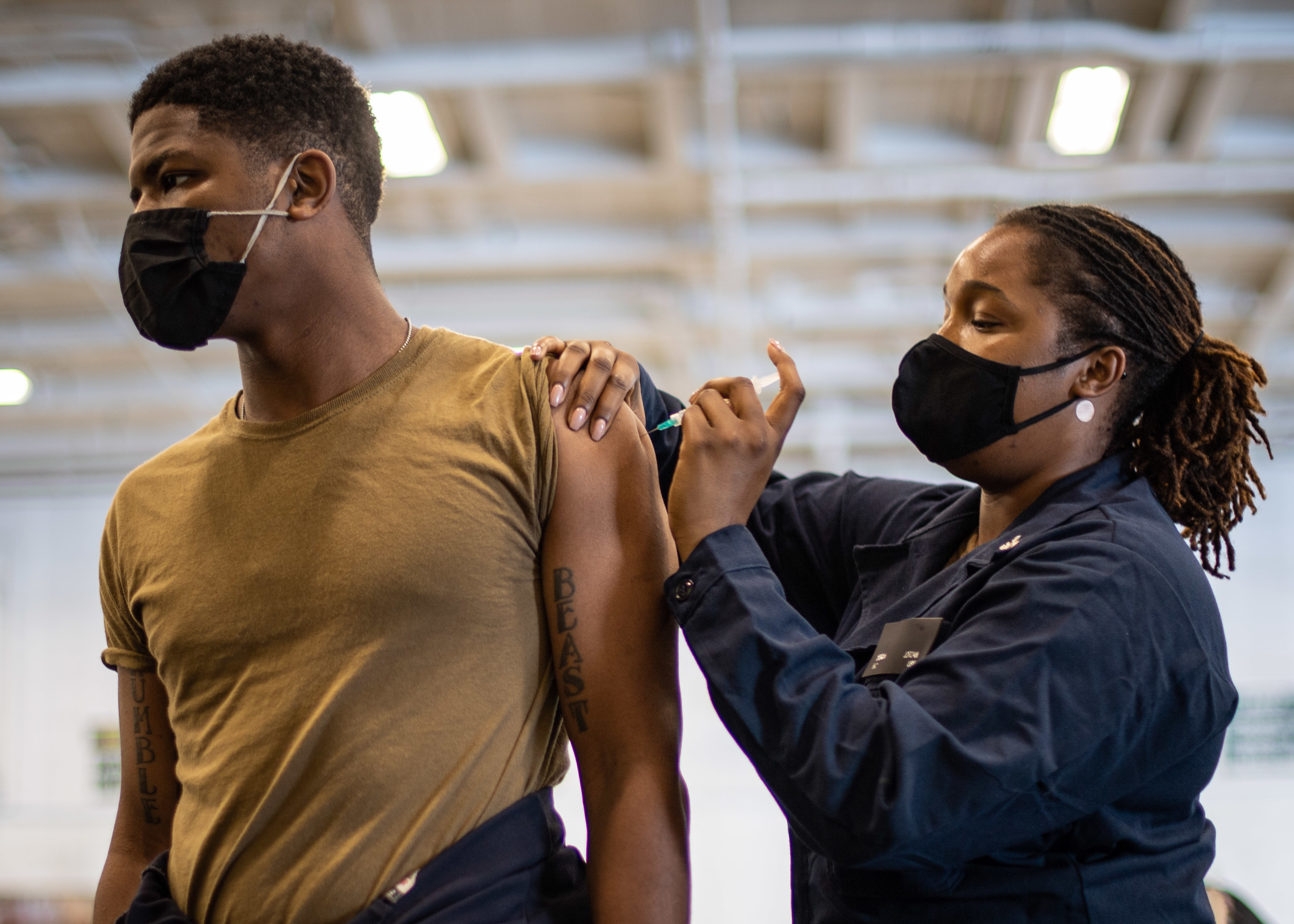
A US Navy hospital corpsman administers a flu shot aboard the USS Theodore Roosevelt (CVN-71) in 2020.

In unvaccinated adults, 16% get symptoms similar to the flu, while about 10% of vaccinated adults do. Vaccination decreased confirmed cases of influenza from about 2.4% to 1.1%. No effect on hospitalization was found.

A combined analysis of influenza studies from 1997-2023 showed that roughly two-thirds of individuals achieve an antibody response 1-month post-vaccination needed for 50% protection, where half of these individuals already had this strong antibody response pre-vaccination while the other half only reached it post-vaccination. Thus, 1/3 of this population was protected before receiving a vaccine, 1/3 became protected through vaccination, and another 1/3 had a weak antibody response even after vaccination. Despite this variability, a person's pre-vaccination antibody response against multiple influenza variants predicted their post-vaccination response.

In working adults, a review by the Cochrane Collaboration found that vaccination resulted in a modest decrease in both influenza symptoms and working days lost, without affecting transmission or influenza-related complications. In healthy working adults, influenza vaccines can provide moderate protection against virologically confirmed influenza, though such protection is greatly reduced or absent in some seasons.

In health care workers, a 2006 review found a net benefit. Of the eighteen studies in this review, only two also assessed the relationship of patient mortality relative to staff influenza vaccine uptake; both found that higher rates of healthcare worker vaccination correlated with reduced patient deaths. A 2014 review found benefits to patients when health care workers were immunized, as supported by moderate evidence based in part on the observed reduction in all-cause deaths in patients whose health care workers were given immunization compared with comparison patients where the workers were not offered the vaccine.

=== Elderly ===
Evidence for an effect in adults over 65 is unclear. Systematic reviews examining both randomized controlled and case–control studies found a lack of high-quality evidence. Reviews of case-control studies found effects against laboratory-confirmed influenza, pneumonia, and death among the community-dwelling elderly.

The group most vulnerable to non-pandemic flu, the elderly, benefits least from the vaccine. There are multiple reasons behind this steep decline in vaccine efficacy, the most common of which are the declining immunological function and frailty associated with advanced age. In a non-pandemic year, a person in the United States aged 50–64 is nearly ten times more likely to die an influenza-associated death than a younger person, and a person over 65 is more than ten times more likely to die an influenza-associated death than the 50–64 age group.

There is a high-dose flu vaccine specifically formulated to provide a stronger immune response. Available evidence indicates that vaccinating the elderly with the high-dose vaccine leads to a stronger immune response against influenza than the regular-dose vaccine.

A flu vaccine containing an adjuvant was approved by the US Food and Drug Administration (FDA) in November 2015, for use by adults aged 65 years of age and older. The vaccine is marketed as Fluad in the US and was first available in the 2016–2017 flu season. The vaccine contains the MF59C.1 adjuvant which is an oil-in-water emulsion of squalene oil. It is the first adjuvanted seasonal flu vaccine marketed in the United States. It is not clear if there is a significant benefit for the elderly to use a flu vaccine containing the MF59C.1 adjuvant. Per Advisory Committee on Immunization Practices guidelines, Fluad can be used as an alternative to other influenza vaccines approved for people 65 years and older.

Vaccinating healthcare workers who work with elderly people is recommended in many countries, with the goal of reducing influenza outbreaks in this vulnerable population. While there is no conclusive evidence from randomized clinical trials that vaccinating health care workers helps protect elderly people from influenza, there is tentative evidence of benefit.

Fluad Quad was approved for use in Australia in September 2019, Fluad Quadrivalent was approved for use in the United States in February 2020, and Fluad Tetra was authorized for use in the European Union in May 2020.

Influenza vaccination rate elderly (OECD)

Flu vaccines older people recommendation

=== Pregnancy ===
As well as protecting mother and child from the effects of an influenza infection, the immunization of pregnant women tends to increase their chances of experiencing a successful full-term pregnancy.

The trivalent inactivated influenza vaccine is protective in pregnant women infected with HIV.

== Safety ==
=== Side effects ===
Common side effects of vaccination include local injection-site reactions and cold-like symptoms. Fever, malaise, and myalgia are less common. Flu vaccines are contraindicated for people who have experienced a severe allergic reaction in response to a flu vaccine or to any component of the vaccine. LAIVs are not given to children or adolescents with severe immunodeficiency or to those who are using salicylate treatments because of the risk of developing Reye syndrome. LAIVs are also not recommended for children under the age of 2, pregnant women, and adults with immunosuppression. Inactivated flu vaccines cannot cause influenza and are regarded as safe during pregnancy.

While side effects of the flu vaccine may occur, they are usually minor, including soreness, redness, swelling around the point of injection, headache, fever, nausea, or fatigue. Side effects of a nasal spray vaccine may include runny nose, wheezing, sore throat, cough, or vomiting.

In some people, a flu vaccine may cause serious side effects, including an allergic reaction, but this is rare. Furthermore, the common side effects and risks are mild and temporary when compared to the risks and severe health effects of the annual influenza epidemic.

Contrary to a common misconception, flu shots cannot cause people to get the flu.

=== Guillain–Barré syndrome ===
Although Guillain–Barré syndrome had been feared as a complication of vaccination, the CDC states that most studies on modern influenza vaccines have seen no link with Guillain–Barré. Infection with influenza virus itself increases both the risk of death (up to one in ten thousand) and the risk of developing Guillain–Barré syndrome to a far higher level than the highest level of suspected vaccine involvement (approximately ten times higher by 2009 estimates).

Although one review gives an incidence of about one case of Guillain–Barré per million vaccinations, a large study in China, covering close to a hundred million doses of vaccine against the 2009 H1N1 "swine" flu found only eleven cases of Guillain–Barré syndrome, (0.1 per million doses) total incidence in persons vaccinated, actually lower than the normal rate of the disease in China, and no other notable side effects.

=== Egg allergy ===
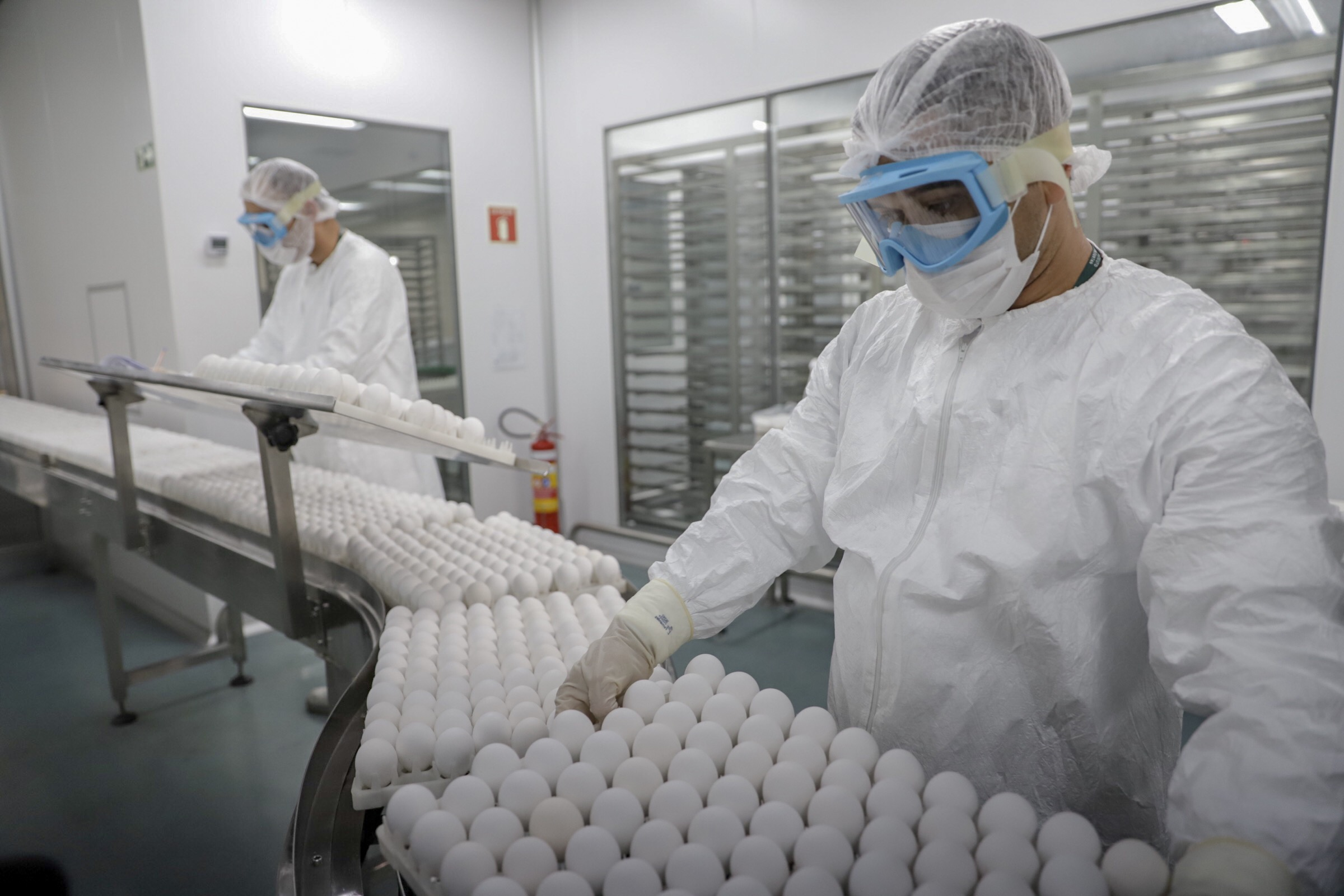
Fresh eggs being prepared for influenza vaccine production at Instituto Butantan

Although most influenza vaccines are produced using egg-based techniques, influenza vaccines are nonetheless still recommended as safe for people with egg allergies, even if severe, as no increased risk of allergic reaction to the egg-based vaccines has been shown for people with egg allergies. Studies examining the safety of influenza vaccines in people with severe egg allergies found that anaphylaxis was very rare, occurring in 1.3 cases per million doses given.

Monitoring for symptoms from vaccination is recommended in those with more severe symptoms. A study of nearly 800 children with egg allergy, including over 250 with previous anaphylactic reactions, had zero systemic allergic reactions when given the live attenuated flu vaccine.

Vaccines produced using other technologies, notably recombinant vaccines and those based on cell culture rather than egg protein, started to become available in 2012 in the US, and later in Europe and Australia.

=== Other ===
Several studies have identified an increased incidence of narcolepsy among recipients of the pandemic H1N1 influenza AS03-adjuvanted vaccine; efforts to identify a mechanism for this suggest that narcolepsy is autoimmune, and that the AS03-adjuvanted H1N1 vaccine may mimic hypocretin, serving as a trigger.

Some injection-based flu vaccines intended for adults in the United States contain thiomersal (also known as thimerosal), a mercury-based preservative. Despite some controversy in the media, the World Health Organization's Global Advisory Committee on Vaccine Safety has concluded that there is no evidence of toxicity from thiomersal in vaccines and no reason on grounds of safety to change to more-expensive single-dose administration.

Exercising before the influenza vaccine is not thought to be harmful but there is no evidence of a beneficial effect either.

== Types ==
Seasonal flu vaccines are available either as:

- an injection containing the inactivated form of the virus. This is usually an intramuscular injection, though subcutaneous and intradermal routes can also be protective.
- a nasal spray of live attenuated influenza vaccine, which contains the live but attenuated (weakened) form of the virus.

The seasonal flu vaccines target at least one virus from each of the A/H1N1, A/H3N2, and B/Victoria lineages. The specific strain used is based on an annual prediction of the next flu season's dominant strain (see section "Annual reformulation" below). The trivalent form targets just these three lineages while the quadrivalent form additionally targets B/Yamagata, which might have become extinct in 2020/2021 due to COVID-19 pandemic measures and is no longer included in WHO recommendations after 2023.

Injected vaccines induce protection based on an immune response to the antigens present on the inactivated virus, while the nasal spray works by establishing short-term infection in the nasal passages.

Vaccines for non-seasonal flu including H5N1 and H5N8 have been approved for humans. See § Rapid response to pandemic flu below.

== Annual reformulation ==
Each year, three influenza strains are chosen for inclusion in the forthcoming year's seasonal flu vaccination by the Global Influenza Surveillance and Response System of the World Health Organization (WHO). The recommendation for trivalent vaccine comprises two strains of Influenza A (one each of A/H1N1 and A/H3N2), and one strain of influenza B (B/Victoria), together representing strains thought most likely to cause significant human suffering in the coming season. Starting in 2012, WHO has also recommended a second influenza B strain (B/Yamagata) for use in quadrivalent vaccines; this was discontinued in 2024.

"The WHO Global Influenza Surveillance Network was established in 1952 (renamed "Global Influenza Surveillance and Response System" in 2011). The network comprises four WHO Collaborating Centres (WHO CCs) and 112 institutions in 83 countries, which are recognized by WHO as WHO National Influenza Centres (NICs). These NICs collect specimens in their country and perform primary virus isolation and preliminary antigenic characterization. They ship newly isolated strains to WHO CCs for high-level antigenic and genetic analysis, the result of which forms the basis for WHO recommendations on the composition of influenza vaccine for the Northern and Southern Hemisphere each year."

Formal WHO recommendations were first issued in 1973. Beginning in 1999 there have been two recommendations per year: one for the northern hemisphere and the other for the southern hemisphere.

Due to the widespread use of non-pharmaceutical interventions (lockdowns) at the beginning of the COVID-19 pandemic, the B/Yamagata influenza lineage has not been isolated since March 2020 and may have been eradicated. Starting with the 2024 Southern Hemisphere influenza season, the WHO and other regulatory bodies have removed B/Yamagata from influenza vaccine recommendations.

== Recommendations ==
Various public health organizations, including the World Health Organization (WHO), recommend that yearly influenza vaccination be routinely offered, particularly to people at risk of complications of influenza and those individuals who live with or care for high-risk individuals, including:

- people aged 50 years of age or older
- people with chronic lung diseases, including asthma
- people with chronic heart diseases
- people with chronic liver diseases
- people with chronic kidney diseases
- people who have had their spleen removed or whose spleen is not working properly
- people who are immunocompromised
- residents of nursing homes and other long-term care facilities
- health care workers (both to prevent sickness and to prevent spread to their patients)
- women who are or will be pregnant during the influenza season
- children and adolescents (aged 6 months through 18 years) who are receiving aspirin- or salicylate-containing medications and who might be at risk for experiencing Reye syndrome after influenza virus infection
- American Indians/Alaska Natives
- people who are extremely obese (body mass index ≥40 for adults)

The flu vaccine is contraindicated for those under six months of age and those with severe, life-threatening allergies to flu vaccine or any ingredient in the vaccine.

=== World Health Organization ===
As of 2016, the World Health Organization (WHO) recommends seasonal influenza vaccination for:

First priority:

- Pregnant women

Second priority (in no particular order):

- Children aged 6–59 months
- Elderly
- Individuals with specific chronic medical conditions
- Health-care workers

=== Canada ===
The National Advisory Committee on Immunization (NACI), the group that advises the Public Health Agency of Canada, recommends that everyone over six months of age be encouraged to receive annual influenza vaccination and that children between the age of six months and 24 months, and their household contacts, should be considered a high priority for the flu vaccine. Particularly:

- People at high risk of influenza-related complications or hospitalization, including people who are morbidly obese, healthy pregnant women, children aged 6–59 months, the elderly, aboriginals, and people with one of an itemized list of chronic health conditions
- People capable of transmitting influenza to those at high risk, including household contacts and healthcare workers
- People who provide essential community services
- Certain poultry workers

Live attenuated influenza vaccine (LAIV) was not available in Canada for the 2019–2020 season.

=== European Union ===
The European Centre for Disease Prevention and Control (ECDC) recommends vaccinating the elderly as a priority, with a secondary priority for people with chronic medical conditions and health care workers.

The influenza vaccination strategy is generally that of protecting vulnerable people, rather than limiting influenza circulation or eliminating human influenza sickness. This is in contrast with the high herd immunity strategies for other infectious diseases such as polio and measles. This is also due in part to the financial and logistics burden associated with the need of an annual injection.

=== United Kingdom ===
The National Health Service in the United Kingdom provides flu vaccination to:

- people who are aged 65 or over
- people who have certain long-term health conditions
- people who are pregnant
- people who live in a care home
- people who are the main carer for an older or disabled person, or receive a carer's allowance
- people who live with someone who has a weakened immune system.

This vaccination is available free of charge to people in these groups. People outside these groups aged between 18 and 65 years of age can also receive private flu vaccination for a small fee from pharmacies and some private surgeries.

=== United States ===
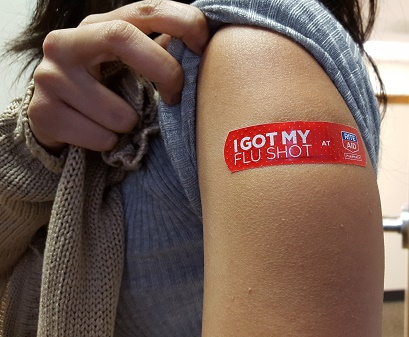
A young woman displays her bandage after receiving the vaccine at a drug store.

In the United States routine influenza vaccination is recommended for all persons aged six months and over. It takes up to two weeks after vaccination for sufficient antibodies to develop in the body. The CDC recommends vaccination before the end of October, although it considers getting a vaccine in December or even later to be still beneficial. The U.S. military also requires a flu shot annually for its active and reserve servicemembers.

According to the CDC, the live attenuated virus (LAIV4) (which comes in the form of nasal spray in the US) should be avoided by some groups.

Within its blanket recommendation for general vaccination in the United States, the CDC, which began recommending the influenza vaccine to healthcare workers in 1981, emphasizes to clinicians the special urgency of vaccination for members of certain vulnerable groups, and their caregivers:

Vaccination is especially important for people at higher risk of serious influenza complications or people who live with or care for people at higher risk for serious complications. In 2009, a new high-dose formulation of the standard influenza vaccine was approved. The Fluzone High Dose is specifically for people 65 and older; the difference is that it has four times the antigen dose of the standard Fluzone.

The US government requires hospitals to report worker vaccination rates. Some US states and hundreds of US hospitals require healthcare workers to either get vaccinations or wear masks during flu season. These requirements occasionally engender union lawsuits on narrow collective bargaining grounds, but proponents note that courts have generally endorsed forced vaccination laws affecting the general population during disease outbreaks.

Vaccination against influenza is especially considered important for members of high-risk groups who would be likely to have complications from influenza, for example pregnant women and children and teenagers from six months to 18 years of age who are receiving aspirin- or salicylate-containing medications and who might be at risk for experiencing Reye syndrome after influenza virus infection;

- In raising the upper age limit to 18 years, the aim is to reduce both the time children and parents lose from visits to pediatricians and missing school and the need for antibiotics for complications
- An added benefit expected from the vaccination of children is a reduction in the number of influenza cases among parents and other household members, and of possible spread to the general community.

The CDC indicated that live attenuated influenza vaccine (LAIV), also called the nasal spray vaccine, was not recommended for the 2016–2017 flu season in the United States.

Furthermore, the CDC recommends that healthcare personnel who care for severely immunocompromised persons receive injections (TIV or QIV) rather than LAIV.

=== Australia ===
The Australian Government recommends seasonal flu vaccination for everyone over the age of six months. Australia uses inactivated vaccines. Until 2021, the egg-based vaccine has been the only one available (and continues to be the only free one), but from March 2021 a new cell-based vaccine is available for those who wish to pay for it, and it is expected that this one will become the standard by 2026. The standard flu vaccine is free for the following people:

- children aged six months to five years;
- people aged 65 years and over;
- Aboriginal and Torres Strait Islander people aged six months and over;
- pregnant women; and
- anyone over six months of age with medical conditions such as severe asthma, lung disease or heart disease, low immunity, or diabetes that can lead to complications from influenza.

== Uptake ==
Vaccination rate in the OECD, 2018 or latest
Country	Region	% aged 65+
Republic of Korea	Asia	83
Australia	Oceania	75
United Kingdom	Europe	73
United States	Americas	68
New Zealand	Oceania	65
Chile	Americas	65
Netherlands	Europe	64
Canada	Americas	61
Portugal	Europe	61
Israel	Asia	58
Ireland	Europe	58
Spain	Europe	54
Italy	Europe	53
Denmark	Europe	52
Japan	Asia	50
France	Europe	50
Sweden	Europe	49
Finland	Europe	48
Iceland	Europe	45
Luxembourg	Europe	38
Germany	Europe	35
Norway	Europe	34
Hungary	Europe	27
Czech Republic	Europe	20
Lithuania	Europe	13
Slovak Republic	Europe	13
Slovenia	Europe	12
Latvia	Europe	8
Turkey	Asia	7
Estonia	Europe	5

=== At risk groups ===
Uptake of flu vaccination, both seasonally and during pandemics, is often low. Systematic reviews of pandemic flu vaccination uptake have identified several personal factors that may influence uptake, including gender (higher uptake in men), ethnicity (higher in people from ethnic minorities), and having a chronic illness. Beliefs in the safety and effectiveness of the vaccine are also important.

Several measures are useful to increase rates of vaccination in those over sixty including patient reminders using leaflets and letters, postcard reminders, client outreach programs, vaccine home visits, group vaccinations, free vaccinations, physician payment, physician reminders, and encouraging physician competition.

=== Health care workers ===
Frontline healthcare workers are often recommended to get seasonal and any pandemic flu vaccinations. For example, in the UK all healthcare workers involved in patient care are recommended to receive the seasonal flu vaccine, and were also recommended to be vaccinated against the H1N1/09 (later renamed A(H1N1)pdm09 (Note: (H1N1)pdm09 is newer nomenclature for the 2009 pandemic H1N1 virus, not a different strain.)) swine flu virus during the 2009 pandemic. However, uptake is often low. During the 2009 pandemic, low uptake by healthcare workers was seen in countries including the UK, Italy, Greece, and Hong Kong.

In a 2010 survey of United States healthcare workers, 63.5% reported that they received the flu vaccine during the 2010–11 season, an increase from 61.9% reported the previous season. US Health professionals with direct patient contact had higher vaccination uptake, such as physicians and dentists (84.2%) and nurse practitioners (82.6%).

The main reason to vaccinate health care workers is to prevent staff from spreading flu to their patients and to reduce staff absence at a time of high service demand, but the reasons health care workers state for their decisions to accept or decline vaccination may more often be to do with perceived personal benefits.

In Victoria (Australia) public hospitals, rates of healthcare worker vaccination in 2005 ranged from 34% for non-clinical staff to 42% for laboratory staff. One of the reasons for rejecting vaccines was concern over adverse reactions; in one study, 31% of resident physicians at a teaching hospital incorrectly believed Australian vaccines could cause influenza.

== Manufacturing ==
Schematic of influenza vaccine creation

Research continues into the idea of a "universal" influenza vaccine that would not require tailoring to a particular strain, but would be effective against a broad variety of influenza viruses. No vaccine candidates had been announced by November 2007, but as of 2021, there are several universal vaccines candidates, in pre-clinical development and in clinical trials.

In a 2007 report, the global capacity of approximately 826 million seasonal influenza vaccine doses (inactivated and live) was double the production of 413 million doses. In an aggressive scenario of producing pandemic influenza vaccines by 2013, only 2.8 billion courses could be produced in a six-month time frame. If all high- and upper-middle-income countries sought vaccines for their entire populations in a pandemic, nearly two billion courses would be required. If China pursued this goal as well, more than three billion courses would be required to serve these populations. Vaccine research and development is ongoing to identify novel vaccine approaches that could produce much greater quantities of vaccine at a price that is affordable to the global population.

=== Egg-based ===
Most flu vaccines are grown by vaccine manufacturers in fertilized chicken eggs. In the Northern hemisphere, the manufacturing process begins following the announcement (typically in February) of the WHO recommended strains for the winter flu season. Three strains (representing an H1N1, an H3N2, and a B strain) of flu are selected and chicken eggs are inoculated separately. These monovalent harvests are then combined to make the trivalent vaccine.

Avian flu vaccine development by reverse genetics technique

As of November 2007, both the conventional injection and the nasal spray are manufactured using chicken eggs. The European Union also approved Optaflu, a vaccine produced by Novartis using vats of animal cells. This technique is expected to be more scalable and avoid problems with eggs, such as allergic reactions and incompatibility with strains that affect avians like chickens.

Influenza vaccines are produced in pathogen-free eggs that are eleven or twelve days old. The top of the egg is disinfected by wiping it with alcohol and then the egg is candled to identify a non-veinous area in the allantoic cavity where a small hole is poked to serve as a pressure release. A second hole is made at the top of the egg, where the influenza virus is injected in the allantoic cavity, past the chorioallantoic membrane. The two holes are then sealed with melted paraffin and the inoculated eggs are incubated for 48 hours at 37 degrees Celsius. During the incubation time, the virus replicates and newly replicated viruses are released into the allantoic fluid

After the 48-hour incubation period, the top of the egg is cracked and ten milliliters of allantoic fluid is removed, from which about fifteen micrograms of the flu vaccine can be obtained. At this point, the viruses have been weakened or killed and the viral antigen is purified and placed inside vials, syringes, or nasal sprayers. Up to 3 eggs are needed to produce one dose of a trivalent vaccine, and an estimated 600 million eggs are produced each year for flu vaccine production.

=== Other methods of manufacture ===
Methods of vaccine generation that bypass the need for eggs include the construction of influenza virus-like particles (VLP). VLP resemble viruses, but there is no need for inactivation, as they do not include viral coding elements, but merely present antigens in a similar manner to a virion. Some methods of producing VLP include cultures of Spodoptera frugiperda Sf9 insect cells and plant-based vaccine production (e.g., production in Nicotiana benthamiana). There is evidence that some VLPs elicit antibodies that recognize a broader panel of antigenically distinct viral isolates compared to other vaccines in the hemagglutination-inhibition assay (HIA).

A gene-based DNA vaccine, used to prime the immune system after boosting with an inactivated H5N1 vaccine, underwent clinical trials in 2011.

In November 2012, Novartis received FDA approval for the first cell-culture vaccine. In 2013, the recombinant influenza vaccine, Flublok, was approved for use in the United States.

In September 2020, the Committee for Medicinal Products for Human Use (CHMP) of the European Medicines Agency (EMA) adopted a positive opinion, recommending the granting of a marketing authorization for Supemtek, a quadrivalent influenza vaccine (recombinant, prepared in cell culture). The applicant for this medicinal product is Sanofi Pasteur. Supemtek was authorized for medical use in the European Union in November 2020.

In January 2026, the CHMP adopted a positive opinion, recommending the granting of a marketing authorization for the medicinal product Supemtek, intended for active immunization against influenza disease in adults and children from nine years of age. The applicant for this medicinal product is Sanofi Winthrop Industrie.

Australia authorized its first cell-based vaccine in March 2021, based on an "eternal cell line" of a dog kidney. Because of the way it is produced, it produces better-matched vaccines (to the flu strains).

=== Vaccine manufacturing countries ===
According to the WHO, as of 2019, countries where influenza vaccine is produced include:

- Australia
- Brazil
- Canada
- China
- France
- Germany
- Hungary
- India
- Iran
- Japan
- Mexico
- Netherlands
- Nicaragua
- Russian Federation
- South Korea
- United Kingdom
- United States
- Vietnam

In addition, Kazakhstan, Serbia, and Thailand had facilities in the final stages of establishing production.

== Cost-effectiveness ==
The cost-effectiveness of seasonal influenza vaccination has been widely evaluated for different groups and in different settings. In the elderly (over 65), the majority of published studies have found that vaccination is cost-saving, with the cost savings associated with influenza vaccination (e.g. prevented health care visits) outweighing the cost of vaccination. In older adults (aged 50–64 years), several published studies have found that influenza vaccination is likely to be cost-effective, however, the results of these studies were often found to be dependent on key assumptions used in the economic evaluations. The uncertainty in influenza cost-effectiveness models can partially be explained by the complexities involved in estimating the disease burden, as well as the seasonal variability in the circulating strains and the match of the vaccine. In healthy working adults (aged 18–49 years), a 2012 review found that vaccination was generally not cost-saving, with the suitability for funding being dependent on the willingness to pay to obtain the associated health benefits. In children, the majority of studies have found that influenza vaccination was cost-effective, however many of the studies included (indirect) productivity gains, which may not be given the same weight in all settings. Several studies have attempted to predict the cost-effectiveness of interventions (including pre-pandemic vaccination) to help protect against a future pandemic, however estimating the cost-effectiveness has been complicated by uncertainty as to the severity of a potential future pandemic and the efficacy of measures against it.

== Research ==
Influenza research includes molecular virology, molecular evolution, pathogenesis, host immune responses, genomics, and epidemiology. These help in developing influenza countermeasures such as vaccines, therapies, and diagnostic tools. Improved influenza countermeasures require basic research on how viruses enter cells, replicate, mutate, evolve into new strains, and induce an immune response. The Influenza Genome Sequencing Project is creating a library of influenza sequences that will help researchers' understanding of what makes one strain more lethal than another, what genetic determinants most affect immunogenicity, and how the virus evolves.

A different approach uses Internet content to estimate the impact of an influenza vaccination campaign. More specifically, researchers have used data from Twitter and Microsoft's Bing search engine and proposed a statistical framework that, after a series of operations, maps this information to estimates of the influenza-like illness reduction percentage in areas where vaccinations have been performed. The method has been used to quantify the impact of two flu vaccination programmes in England (2013/14 and 2014/15), where school-age children were administered a live attenuated influenza vaccine (LAIV). Notably, the impact estimates were in accordance with estimations from Public Health England based on traditional syndromic surveillance endpoints.

=== Rapid response to pandemic flu ===
The rapid development, production, and distribution of pandemic influenza vaccines could potentially save millions of lives during an influenza pandemic. Due to the short time frame between the identification of a pandemic strain and the need for vaccination, researchers are looking at novel technologies for vaccine production that could provide better "real-time" access and be produced more affordably, thereby increasing access for people living in low- and moderate-income countries, where an influenza pandemic may likely originate, such as live attenuated (egg-based or cell-based) technology and recombinant technologies (proteins and virus-like particles). As of July 2009, more than seventy known clinical trials have been completed or are ongoing for pandemic influenza vaccines. In September 2009, the FDA approved four vaccines against the 2009 H1N1 influenza virus (the 2009 pandemic strain), and expected the initial vaccine lots to be available within the following month.

In January 2020, the US Food and Drug Administration (FDA) approved Audenz as a vaccine for the H5N1 flu virus. Audenz is a vaccine indicated for active immunization for the prevention of disease caused by the influenza A virus H5N1 subtype contained in the vaccine. Audenz is approved for use in persons six months of age and older at increased risk of exposure to the influenza A virus H5N1 subtype contained in the vaccine.

Zoonotic influenza vaccine Seqirus is authorized for use in the European Union. It is an H5N8 vaccine that is intended to provide acquired immunity against H5 subtype influenza A viruses.

=== Universal flu vaccines ===
A universal influenza vaccine that would not have to be designed and made for each flu season in each hemisphere would stabilize the supply, avoid errors in predicting the season's variants, and protect against the escape of the circulating strains by mutation. Such a vaccine has been the subject of research for decades.

One approach is to use broadly neutralizing antibodies that, unlike the annual seasonal vaccines used over the first decades of the 21st century that provoke the body to generate an immune response, instead provide a component of the immune response itself. The first neutralizing antibodies were identified in 1993, via experimentation. It was found that the flu neutralizing antibodies bound to the stalk of the Hemagglutinin protein. Antibodies that could bind to the head of those proteins were identified. The highly conserved M2 proton channel was proposed as a potential target for broadly neutralizing antibodies.

The challenges for researchers are to identify single antibodies that could neutralize many subtypes of the virus so that they could be useful in any season, and that target conserved domains that are resistant to antigenic drift.

Another approach is to take the conserved domains identified from these projects, and to deliver groups of these antigens to provoke an immune response; various approaches with different antigens, presented in different ways (as fusion proteins, mounted on virus-like particles, on non-pathogenic viruses, as DNA, and others), are under development.

Efforts have also been undertaken to develop universal vaccines that specifically activate a T-cell response, based on clinical data showing that people with a strong, early T-cell response have better outcomes when infected with influenza and because T-cells respond to conserved epitopes. The challenge for developers is that these epitopes are on internal protein domains that are only mildly immunogenic.

Along with the rest of the vaccine field, people working on universal vaccines have experimented with vaccine adjuvants to improve the ability of their vaccines to create a sufficiently powerful and enduring immune response.

=== Oral influenza vaccine ===
As of 2019, an oral flu vaccine was in clinical research. The oral vaccine candidate is based on an adenovirus type 5 vector modified to remove genes needed for replication, with an added gene that expresses a small double-stranded RNA hairpin molecule as an adjuvant. In 2020, a phase II human trial of the pill form of the vaccine showed that it was well tolerated and provided similar immunity to a licensed injectable vaccine.

=== Possible Pleiotropic Effects ===
Recent observational studies and clinical trials suggest nonspecific effects of influenza vaccination, known as pleiotropic effects, with broader impact beyond protecting against influenza infection. A meta-analysis of 9001 randomized trial participants found that influenza vaccination was associated with a 34% lower risk of major adverse cardiovascular events when compared to placebo. This risk reduction size is comparable to the cardioprotective effects seen with other guideline-recommended cardiovascular medications, including statins. Protection against stroke of all etiologies has also been suggested in a large population-based retrospective cohort study of 4 million adults in Canada. There may also be protective effects against the development of type 1 diabetes and cancer-related mortality, which are active areas of investigation.

=== COVID-19 ===
An influenza vaccine and a COVID-19 vaccine may be given safely at the same time. Preliminary research indicates that influenza vaccination does not prevent COVID-19, but may reduce the incidence and severity of COVID-19 infection.

=== Criticism ===
In 2006 Tom Jefferson, who has led Cochrane Collaboration reviews of flu vaccines, called clinical evidence concerning flu vaccines "rubbish", and said that they were ineffective; he called for placebo-controlled randomized clinical trials, which most in the field hold as unethical. His views on the efficacy of flu vaccines are rejected by medical institutions including the CDC and the National Institutes of Health, and by key figures in the field like Anthony Fauci.

Michael Osterholm, who led the Center for Infectious Disease Research and Policy 2012 review on flu vaccines, recommended getting the vaccine but criticized its promotion, saying, "We have overpromoted and overhyped this vaccine ... it does not protect as promoted. It's all a sales job: it's all public relations."

== Veterinary use ==
Veterinary influenza vaccination aims to achieve the following four objectives:

1. Protection from clinical disease
2. Protection from infection with virulent virus
3. Protection from virus excretion
4. Serological differentiation of infected from vaccinated animals (so-called DIVA principle).

=== Horses ===
Horses with horse flu can run a fever, have a dry hacking cough, have a runny nose, and become depressed and reluctant to eat or drink for several days but usually recover in two to three weeks. "Vaccination schedules generally require a primary course of two doses, 3–6 weeks apart, followed by boosters at 6–12 month intervals. It is generally recognized that in many cases such schedules may not maintain protective levels of antibody and more frequent administration is advised in high-risk situations."

It is a common requirement at shows in the United Kingdom that horses be vaccinated against equine flu and a vaccination card must be produced; the International Federation for Equestrian Sports (FEI) requires vaccination every six months.

=== Poultry ===
It is possible to vaccinate poultry against specific strains of highly pathogenic avian influenza. Vaccination should be combined with other control measures such as infection monitoring, early detection, and biosecurity.

=== Pigs ===
Swine influenza vaccines are extensively used in pig farming in Europe and North America. Most swine flu vaccines include an H1N1 and an H3N2 strain.

Swine influenza has been recognized as a major problem since the outbreak in 1976. Evolution of the virus has resulted in inconsistent responses to traditional vaccines. Standard commercial swine flu vaccines are effective in controlling the problem when the virus strains match enough to have significant cross-protection. Customised (autogenous) vaccines made from the specific viruses isolated are made and used in the more difficult cases. The vaccine manufacturer Novartis claims that the H3N2 strain (first identified in 1998) has brought major losses to pig farmers. Abortion storms are a common sign and sows stop eating for a few days and run a high fever. The mortality rate can be as high as fifteen percent.

=== Dogs ===
In 2004, influenza A virus subtype H3N8 was discovered to cause canine influenza. Because of the lack of previous exposure to this virus, dogs have no natural immunity to this virus. However, a vaccine was found in 2004.
