= Canadian Journal of Neurological Sciences =

- Discipline: Neurology, neurosurgery, clinical neurophysiology, neuroradiology
- Language: English
- Edited by: Tejas Sankar

Publication details
- History: 1974–present
- Publisher: Cambridge University Press on behalf of the Canadian Neurological Sciences Federation
- Frequency: Bimonthly
- Impact factor: 3.2 (2022)

Standard abbreviations
- ISO 4: Can. J. Neurol. Sci.

Indexing
- CODEN: CJNSA2
- ISSN: 0317-1671 (print); 2057-0155 (web)
- OCLC no.: 01793789

Links
- Journal homepage; Online access; Online archive

The Canadian Journal of Neurological Sciences is a bimonthly peer-reviewed medical journal and the official journal of the Canadian Neurological Society, Canadian Neurosurgical Society, Canadian Society of Clinical Neurophysiologists, Canadian Association of Child Neurology, and the Canadian Society of Neuroradiology, which collectively form the Canadian Neurological Sciences Federation. Articles are published in English with abstracts in both English and French. According to the Journal Citation Reports, the journal has a 2022 impact factor of 3.2.
