= AS03 =

Vaccine ingredient

AS03 (for "Adjuvant System 03") is the trade name for a squalene-based immunologic adjuvant used in various vaccine products by GlaxoSmithKline (GSK). It is used, for example, in GSK's A/H1N1 pandemic flu vaccine Pandemrix. It is also in Arepanrix and the Q-pan for H5N1 influenza. A dose of AS03 adjuvant contains

- 10.69 mg squalene
- 11.86 mg DL-α-tocopherol (vitamin E)
- 4.86 mg polysorbate 80

AS03 is a kind of oil-in-water emulsion. Squalene and vitamin E form the center of small drops of AS03 while the surfactant polysorbate 80 gather on the surface to help stabilize the emulsion. AS03 is the first oil-water-adjuvant for humans that uses vitamin E.

In the 2009 influenza pandemic, vaccines containing AS03 delivered a stronger immunogene response against pandemic H1N1 influenza than non-adjuvanted vaccines, despite their containing lower levels of viral antigen. AS03 is

== Narcolepsy ==
Small observational studies reported from Finland and Sweden in 2012, and larger studies from Ireland reported in 2012, and reported in each of England, Norway and France in 2013, found an association between narcolepsy and Pandemrix; the rates ranged from one in 16,000 doses to one in 50,000 doses. The association remains seen in later analyses, such as one from 2016.

All cases happened in HLA-DQB1*0602 carriers, suggesting that carrier status could be a necessary condition for AS03-related narcolepsy. However, only 0.02% of *0602 carriers who took the vaccine developed nacrolepsy, so there needs to be additional causes. Among those who develop narcolepsy, certain variants in GDNF-AS1 and TRAJ are more common than the ones who do not, suggesting that these two loci can play a role.

It is currently unclear what the process for causing narcolepsy entails. Of the three ingredients of AS03, squalene and polysorbate 80 both has long histoies of use in other vaccines and will not explain the uniqueness of the Pandemrix reaction, so vitamin E is the main suspect if one is looking at the adjuvant itself. The amount of vitamin E is no more than a day's normal dietary intake. Vitamin E increases hypocretin-specific fragments that bind to HLA-DQB1*0602 in cell culture experiments, lending credence to this theory. Some studies suggest that the virus protein antigen may play a role.

== See also ==
- 2009 flu pandemic
- MF59 – another squalene-based adjuvant by Novartis
- AS04 – another adjuvant by GSK
