= MF59 =

Squalene-based adjuvant

MF59 is an immunologic adjuvant developed using squalene. It is Novartis's proprietary adjuvant that is added to influenza vaccines to help stimulate the human body's immune response through production of CD4 memory T cells.

MF59 is the first oil-in-water influenza vaccine adjuvant to be commercialized in combination with a seasonal influenza virus vaccine. MF59 is used as an adjuvant in Canada, Europe and the United States. MF59 was developed in the 1990s by researchers at Chiron Corporation, a Novartis heritage company, acquired by Novartis in 2006.

== See also ==
- AS03, another squalene based adjuvant
