= Immunologic adjuvant =

Component of vaccines

In immunology, an adjuvant is a substance that increases or modulates the immune response to a vaccine. The word "adjuvant" comes from the Latin word adiuvare, meaning to help or aid. "An immunologic adjuvant is defined as any substance that acts to accelerate, prolong, or enhance antigen-specific immune responses when used in combination with specific vaccine antigens."

In the early days of vaccine manufacturing, significant variations in the efficacy of different batches of the same vaccine were correctly assumed to be caused by contamination of the reaction vessels. However, it was soon found that more scrupulous cleaning actually seemed to reduce the effectiveness of the vaccines, and some contaminants actually enhanced the immune response.

There are many known adjuvants in widespread use, including potassium alum, various plant and animal derived oils and virosomes.

== Overview ==
Adjuvants in immunology are often used to modify or augment the effects of a vaccine by stimulating the immune system to respond to the vaccine more vigorously, and thus providing increased immunity to a particular disease. Adjuvants accomplish this task by mimicking specific sets of evolutionarily conserved molecules, so called pathogen-associated molecular patterns, which include liposomes, lipopolysaccharide, molecular cages for antigens, components of bacterial cell walls, and endocytosed nucleic acids such as RNA, double-stranded RNA, single-stranded DNA, and unmethylated CpG dinucleotide-containing DNA. Because immune systems have evolved to recognize these specific antigenic moieties, the presence of an adjuvant in conjunction with the vaccine can greatly increase the innate immune response to the antigen by augmenting the activities of dendritic cells, lymphocytes, and macrophages by mimicking a natural infection.

=== Types ===
- Inorganic compounds: potassium alum, aluminium hydroxide, aluminium phosphate, calcium phosphate hydroxide
- Oils: paraffin oil, propolis (only in preclinical studies). Adjuvant 65 (based on peanut oil) was tested in influenza vaccines in the 1970s, but was never released commercially.
  - Freund's incomplete adjuvant is a water-in-oil emulsion, a classical adjuvant. Water-in-oils are generally too reactogenic to be used on humans, however.
  - Squalene is a natural oil made by human bodies. MF59 is an oil-in-water emulsion based on squalene.
- Bacterial products: killed bacteria of the species Bordetella pertussis, Mycobacterium bovis, toxoids. MPL (Monophosphorylated lipid A) is a modified form of a bacterial lipid A protein that is used in several vaccines.
- Plant saponins from Quillaia (soap bark tree), soybean and Polygala senega
- Cytokines: IL-1, IL-2, IL-12
- CpG oligonucleotides
- Combinations: Freund's complete adjuvant (incomplete + dead Mycobacterium), AS01 (combining MPL and Quillaia saponins), Matrix-M (combining Quillaia saponins and two types of fat)
- Small molecules: TLR7/8 agonists (imidazoquinolines, imidazopyrimidines)
- Physical methods: radiofrequency heating (only tested in mice), microneedles (only tested in mice)

=== Inorganic adjuvants ===
==== Aluminium salts ====
There are many adjuvants, some of which are inorganic, that carry the potential to augment immunogenicity. Alum (hydrated potassium double sulfate) was the first aluminium (Al) salt used for this purpose, but has been almost completely replaced by aluminium hydroxide and aluminium phosphate for commercial vaccines. These newer types are also customarily called "alum" in some contexts (distinguished in this article by capitalization). Al salts are the most commonly used adjuvants in human vaccines. Their adjuvant activity was described in 1926.

The precise mechanism of Al salts ("Alum") remains unclear but some insights have been gained. It was formerly thought that they function as delivery systems by generating depots that trap antigens at the injection site, providing a slow release that continues to stimulate the immune system. However, studies have shown that surgical removal of these depots had no impact on the magnitude of IgG1 response. Depot formation is downstream to the adsorption of antigens onto the molecular structure of the adjuvant driven by electrostatic interactions and phosphate exchange. Conventional wisdom holds that one should maximize the adsorbed % of antigens when using an Alum. There is mixed evidence regarding the role of adsorption in the action of Alum, with some studies showing no effect and others showing a positive effect with low antigen doses in antigens of 10–100 kDa. Also, more strongly adsorbing Alums may paradoxically generate a weaker response, possibly because not enough antigen is being shown to the immune system.

Al can trigger dendritic cells and other immune cells to secrete Interleukin 1 beta (IL‑1β), an immune signal that promotes antibody production. Al adheres to the cell's plasma membrane and rearranges certain lipids there. Spurred into action, the dendritic cells pick up the antigen and speed to lymph nodes, where they stick tightly to a helper T cell and presumably induce an immune response. A second mechanism depends on alum killing immune cells at the injection site although researchers aren't sure exactly how alum kills these cells. It has been speculated that the dying cells release DNA which serves as an immune alarm. Some studies found that DNA from dying cells causes them to adhere more tightly to helper T cells which ultimately leads to an increased release of antibodies by B cells. No matter what the mechanism is, Al is not a perfect adjuvant because it does not work with all antigens (e.g. malaria and tuberculosis). However, recent research indicates that alum formulated in a nanoparticle form rather than microparticles can broaden the utility of alum adjuvants and promote stronger adjuvant effects.

Aluminum salt adjuvants can be damaged by freezing, making the vaccine not as effective. Accidental freezing is a concern in vaccine storage, especially in places with poor cold chains. One possible explanation is that freezing causes the loss of hydroxyl groups on the Alum, destabilizing its association with the antigen. Another explanation is the agglomeration of adjuvant-antigen complexes, forming larger particles of lower surface area. In either case, there are a number of cryoprotectants such as glycerine that can be added to the typical vial of aluminum liquid suspension vaccine to reduce the loss of potency. Some scientists are also working on making Alum-containg vaccines suitable for freeze-drying. Freeze-dried vaccines exist as a stable dry powder containing nothing to freeze.

=== Organic adjuvants ===
==== Emulsions ====
The so-called "oil" adjuvants are really oils intended to be made into an emulsion with water, either oil-in-water (O/W) or water-in-oil (W/O). They would not work when moved out of the droplet form.

Freund's complete adjuvant is a solution of inactivated Mycobacterium tuberculosis in mineral oil and/or lanolin developed in 1930. It is used as water-in-oil, It is not safe enough for human use. A safer version without the bacteria is known as Freund's incomplete adjuvant, but its effect is weaker. In either case, the W/O structure probably helps vaccines release antigens for a longer time. Despite the side effects, its potential benefit has led to a few clinical trials, including a few attempts at adding other microbial-derived parts to balance safety and strength. (A common side effect for both versions is long-term retention of the oil in tissue.)

All "oil" adjuvants approved for humans are oil-in-water. They adsorb antigens to their surface and induce immune cell recruitment. All of these human-approved O/W adjuvants use squalene, an oil produced by human liver and skin. MF59 is an oil-in-water emulsion of squalene adjuvant used in some human vaccines. As of 2021, over 22 million doses of one vaccine with squalene, FLUAD, have been administered with no severe adverse effects reported. In addition, squalene-based O/W emulsions have also been shown to stably incorporate small molecule TLR7/8 adjuvants (e.g. PVP-037) and lead to enhanced adjuvanticity via synergism.

An interesting choice of oil in O/W emusions is vitamin E. The α-tocopheryl acetate form can replace the mineral oil in Fruend's adjuvants and is generally very efficacious in animals. The related α-tocopherol is used in AS03 in addition to squalene. Just as its makers had hoped, the AS03-based flu vaccine strong immunity despite using very little antigen; but the same vaccine also caused narcolepsy in a very small amount of people, all sharing one specific gene variant.

O/W emulsions need to be stabilized so they do not revert into one large blob of oil. The more common way is by using a surfactant such as Tween-80. Another way is to use an aluminum microgel.

==== Liposomes ====
Much like the droplets in an emulsion, liposomes are created when watery and oily things mix. However, they are made from phospholipids, which unlike other oil have a water-loving "head" part. This allows it to form lipid bilayers similar to cell membranes. When it encloses a aqueous volume, the result is a liposome.

The plant extract QS-21 is a liposome loaded with saponins extracted from the tree Quillaja saponaria.

The combination of QS-21, cholesterol and MPL forms the liposome adjuvant AS01 which is used in the Shingrix vaccine approved in 2017, as well as in the approved malaria vaccine Mosquirix.

==== Others ====
Monophosphoryl lipid A (MPL), a detoxified version of the lipopolysaccharide toxin from the bacterium Salmonella Minnesota, interacts with the receptor TLR4 to enhance immune response.

Several unmethylated cytosine phosphoguanosine (CpG) oligonucleotides activate the TLR9 receptor that is present in a number of cell types of the immune system. The adjuvant CpG 1018 is used in an approved Hepatitis B vaccine.

The adjuvant Matrix-M is an immune stimulating complex (ISCOM; a specific patented kind of liposome) consisting of nanospheres made of QS-21, cholesterol and phospholipids. It is used in the approved Novavax Covid-19 vaccine and in the malaria vaccine R21/Matrix-M.

== Adaptive immune response ==
In order to understand the links between the innate immune response and the adaptive immune response to help substantiate an adjuvant function in enhancing adaptive immune responses to the specific antigen of a vaccine, the following points should be considered:

- Innate immune response cells such as dendritic cells engulf pathogens through a process called phagocytosis.
- Dendritic cells then migrate to the lymph nodes where T cells (adaptive immune cells) wait for signals to trigger their activation.
- In the lymph nodes, dendritic cells mince the engulfed pathogen and then express the pathogen clippings as antigen on their cell surface by coupling them to a special receptor known as a major histocompatibility complex.
- T cells can then recognize these clippings and undergo a cellular transformation resulting in their own activation.
- γδ T cells possess characteristics of both the innate and adaptive immune responses.
- Macrophages can also activate T cells in a similar approach (but do not do so naturally).

This process carried out by both dendritic cells and macrophages is termed antigen presentation and represents a physical link between the innate and adaptive immune responses.

Upon activation, mast cells release heparin and histamine to effectively increase trafficking to and seal off the site of infection to allow immune cells of both systems to clear the area of pathogens. In addition, mast cells also release chemokines which result in the positive chemotaxis of other immune cells of both the innate and adaptive immune responses to the infected area.

Due to the variety of mechanisms and links between the innate and adaptive immune response, an adjuvant-enhanced innate immune response results in an enhanced adaptive immune response. Specifically, adjuvants may exert their immune-enhancing effects according to five immune-functional activities.

- First, adjuvants may help in the translocation of antigens to the lymph nodes where they can be recognized by T cells. This will ultimately lead to greater T cell activity resulting in a heightened clearance of pathogen throughout the organism.
- Second, adjuvants may provide physical protection to antigens which grants the antigen a prolonged delivery. This means the organism will be exposed to the antigen for a longer duration, making the immune system more robust as it makes use of the additional time by upregulating the production of B and T cells needed for greater immunological memory in the adaptive immune response.
- Third, adjuvants may help to increase the capacity to cause local reactions at the injection site (during vaccination), inducing greater release of danger signals by chemokine releasing cells such as helper T cells and mast cells.
- Fourth, they may induce the release of inflammatory cytokines which helps to not only recruit B and T cells at sites of infection but also to increase transcriptional events leading to a net increase of immune cells as a whole.
- Finally, adjuvants are believed to increase the innate immune response to antigen by interacting with pattern recognition receptors (PRRs) on or within accessory cells.

== Toll-like receptors ==
The ability of the immune system to recognize molecules that are broadly shared by pathogens is, in part, due to the presence of immune receptors called toll-like receptors (TLRs) that are expressed on the membranes of leukocytes including dendritic cells, macrophages, natural killer cells, cells of the adaptive immunity (T and B lymphocytes) and non-immune cells (epithelial and endothelial cells, and fibroblasts).

The binding of ligands – either in the form of adjuvant used in vaccinations or in the form of invasive moieties during times of natural infection – to TLRs mark the key molecular events that ultimately lead to innate immune responses and the development of antigen-specific acquired immunity.

As of 2016, several TLR ligands were in clinical development or being tested in animal models as potential adjuvants.

== Medical complications ==
=== Humans ===
Adjuvants may make vaccines too reactogenic, which often leads to fever. This is often an expected outcome upon vaccination and is usually controlled by oral paracetamol if necessary. Some more severe adverse effects that may exist are:

Aluminium salts used in many human vaccines are regarded as safe by Food and Drug Administration. Aluminum has been suspected to play a role in the development of Alzheimer's disease (AD) ever since 1910 (the modern hypothesis dates to 1965); if there is a link between Al and AD, some concern about intentionally injecting aluminum would be reasonable. However, this "aluminum hypothesis" is not accepted by mainstream AD researchers: the evidence for aluminum having such an effect is scarce and weak compared to the evidence against such an idea. This theory is treated with great disinterest in the mainstream as there's no point in testing something that has failed almost every test. The aluminum hypothesis is one of the medical theories that has wider public acceptance than among professions.

About one in 100,000 French people who receive aluminum adjuvants are diagnosed with macrophagic myofasciitis (MMF). When treated as a medical condition, MMF has symptoms such as muscle pain and fever. Many people who have these symptoms have the "MMF lesion", where an aluminum deposit seems to be causing a perpetual cycle of macrophages ingesting Al and dying from it, though it remains debated whether the two things have a link. It can be treated by a surgery that removes the deposit.

==== Narcolepsy ====
An increased number of narcolepsy (a chronic neurological disorder) cases in children and adolescents was observed in Scandinavian and other European countries after vaccinations to address the H1N1 "swine flu" pandemic in 2009. Narcolepsy has previously been associated with HLA-subtype DQB1*602, which has led to the prediction that it is an autoimmune process. After a series of epidemiological investigations, researchers found that the higher incidence correlated with the use of AS03-adjuvanted influenza vaccine (Pandemrix). Those vaccinated with Pandemrix have almost a twelve-times higher risk of developing the disease. It only affected people who have the HLA-DQB1*0602 variant of the HLA-DQB1 gene, also known as DR2^{+}. 0.02% of *0602 carriers who took the vaccine developed nacrolepsy, so while carrying *0602 and receiving the vaccine are necessary conditions, they are not sufficient. The missing conditions could be some other gene variants.

There are three components in AS03: squalene, DL-α-tocopherol (vitamin E), and polysorbate 80. Squalene and polysorbate 80 both has long histoies of use in other vaccines and will not explain the uniqueness of the Pandemrix reaction, so vitamin E is the main suspect. The amount of vitamin E is no more than a day's normal dietary intake. Vitamin E increases hypocretin-specific fragments that bind to HLA-DQB1*0602 in cell culture experiments, lending credence to this theory. (A definitive proof would be a randomized controlled trial, but a "how many narcoleptics did we make" study would not pass ethical review.)

=== Animals ===
In cats (and some dogs and ferrets) vaccine-associated sarcoma (VAS) or feline injection-site sarcoma (FISS) occurs at a rate of 1–10 per 10,000 injections. In 1993, a causal relationship between VAS and administration of aluminium-adjuvated rabies and FeLV vaccines was established through epidemiologic methods, and in 1996 the Vaccine-Associated Feline Sarcoma Task Force was formed to address the problem. FISS is characterized by an unintentionally prolonged inflammation at the injection site and an imappropriate respose by the other cells to the inflammation. However, evidence conflicts on whether types of vaccines, manufacturers or factors have been associated with sarcomas. It is unknown why humans do not have this reaction.

==== Animal models ====
The safety of adjuvants are often tested using animal models. Model animals are given a dose of the adjuvant (sometimes comparable to real human/animal vaccines, sometimes higher) by injection, at a site that may or may not be analogous to real-life use. For example, aluminium adjuvants can kill motor neurons when subcutaneously injected at the scruff of a mouse's neck; oil–water suspensions such as pristane produces a precursor to lupus when given to mice by intraperitoneal injection; and arthritis-prone rat strains develop rheumatoid arthritis when injected with 0.2–0.3 mL squalene at the tail.

All three examples above concern the classical "grandfathered" adjuvants: if a new adjuvant candidate shows these ill effects in animal testing, it would likely not be further developed, let alone becoming widely used. But more importantly, no effect similar to the above has been found in humans during the decades of their use (including among people genetically predisposed to autoimmunity), showing that animal models are not perfect models – nothing can be a perfect model of another thing, after all.

== Controversy ==
=== TLR signaling ===
As of 2006, the premise that TLR signaling acts as the key node in antigen-mediated inflammatory responses has been in question as researchers have observed antigen-mediated inflammatory responses in leukocytes in the absence of TLR signaling. One researcher found that in the absence of MyD88 and Trif (essential adapter proteins in TLR signaling), they were still able to induce inflammatory responses, increase T cell activation and generate greater B cell abundancy using conventional adjuvants (alum, Freund's complete adjuvant, Freund's incomplete adjuvant, and monophosphoryl-lipid A/trehalose dicorynomycolate (Ribi's adjuvant)).

These observations suggest that although TLR activation can lead to increases in antibody responses, TLR activation is not required to induce enhanced innate and adaptive responses to antigens.

Investigating the mechanisms which underlie TLR signaling has been significant in understanding why adjuvants used during vaccinations are so important in augmenting adaptive immune responses to specific antigens. However, with the knowledge that TLR activation is not required for the immune-enhancing effects caused by common adjuvants, we can conclude that there are, in all likelihood, other receptors besides TLRs that have not yet been characterized, opening the door to future research.

=== Safety ===
Reports after the first Gulf War linked anthrax vaccine adjuvants to Gulf War syndrome in American and British troops. The United States Department of Defense strongly denied the claims.

Discussing the safety of squalene as an adjuvant in 2006, the World Health Organisation stated "follow-up to detect any vaccine-related adverse events will need to be performed." Accordingly no such followup has been published by the WHO.

Petrovsky (2015) is a review that discusses the comparative safety of vaccine adjuvants. It stated that "the biggest remaining challenge in the adjuvant field is to decipher the potential relationship between adjuvants and rare vaccine adverse reactions, such as narcolepsy, macrophagic myofasciitis or Alzheimer's disease."

== See also ==
- Beta-glucan
- Immunomodulator
- Immunostimulant
- Pharmaceutic adjuvant
