= Squalene =

Oily chemical involved in sterol synthesis

- Skeletal formula of squalene

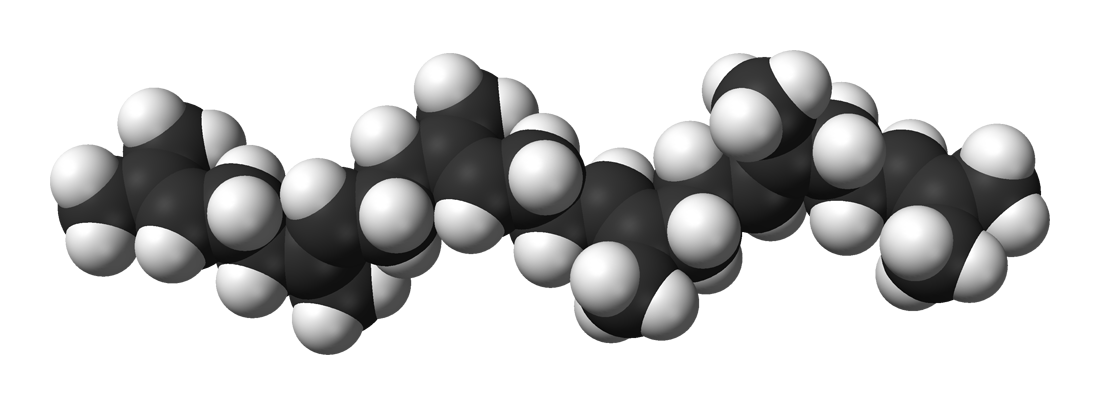
- Spacefill model of squalene

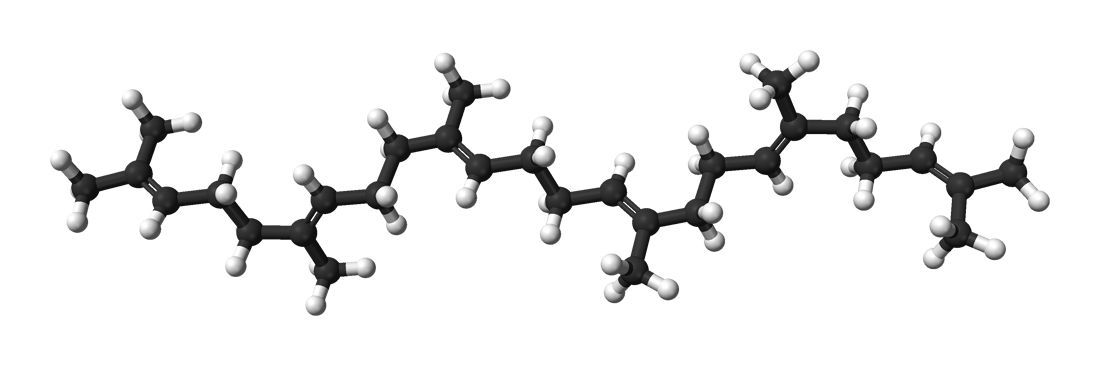
- Ball and stick model of squalene

Names
- Preferred IUPAC name (6E,10E,14E,18E)-2,6,10,15,19,23-Hexamethyltetracosa-2,6,10,14,18,22-hexaene

Identifiers
| CAS Number | 111-02-4 |
| 3D model (JSmol) | Interactive image |
| Beilstein Reference | 1728919 |
| ChEBI | CHEBI:15440 |
| ChEMBL | ChEMBL458402 |
| ChemSpider | 553635 |
| ECHA InfoCard | 100.003.479 |
| EC Number | 203-826-1 |
| IUPHAR/BPS | 3054 |
| KEGG | C00751 |
| MeSH | Squalene |
| PubChem CID | 638072 |
| RTECS number | XB6010000 |
| UNII | 7QWM220FJH |
| CompTox Dashboard (EPA) | DTXSID0026044 |
- InChI: InChI=1S/C30H50/c1-25(2)15-11-19-29(7)23-13-21-27(5)17-9-10-18-28(6)22-14-24-30(8)20-12-16-26(3)4/h15-18,23-24H,9-14,19-22H2,1-8H3/b27-17+,28-18+,29-23+,30-24+ Key: YYGNTYWPHWGJRM-AAJYLUCBSA-N; InChI=1/C30H50/c1-25(2)15-11-19-29(7)23-13-21-27(5)17-9-10-18-28(6)22-14-24-30(8)20-12-16-26(3)4/h15-18,23-24H,9-14,19-22H2,1-8H3
- SMILES: CC(=CCC/C(=C/CC/C(=C/CC/C=C(/CC/C=C(/CCC=C(C)C)\C)\C)/C)/C)C

Properties
| Chemical formula | C_{30}H_{50} |
| Molar mass | 410.730 g·mol^{−1} |
| Appearance | Colourless oil |
| Density | 0.858 g·cm^{−3} |
| Melting point | −5 °C (23 °F; 268 K) |
| Boiling point | 285 °C (545 °F; 558 K) at 3.3 kPa |
| log P | 12.188 |
| Refractive index (n_{D}) | 1.4956 (at 20 °C) |
| Viscosity | 12 cP (at 20 °C) |

Hazards
| NFPA 704 (fire diamond) | 1 1 0 |
| Flash point | 110 °C (230 °F; 383 K) |
- Except where otherwise noted, data are given for materials in their standard state (at 25 °C [77 °F], 100 kPa). verify (what is ?) Infobox references

Squalene is an organic compound. It is a triterpene with the formula C_{30}H_{50}. It is a colourless oil, although impure samples appear yellow. It was originally obtained from shark liver oil (hence its name, as Squalus is a genus of sharks).

Most plants, fungi, and animals produce squalene as a biochemical precursor in sterol biosynthesis, including cholesterol and steroid hormones in the human body. It is also an intermediate in the biosynthesis of hopanoids in many bacteria. In humans, an estimated 12% of bodily squalene is found in sebum.

Squalene is an ingredient in topical products used for skin lubrication, and in some vaccine adjuvants.

== History ==
Squalene was discovered in 1906 by Mitsumaru Tsujimoto, a Japanese researcher in oil and fats. He discovered a certain unsaponifiable fraction of kuroko-zame in a deep sea shark, measuring its formula as C_{10}H_{18}. Previously, the only substantial unsaponifiable fraction in animal oil was cholesterol.

He later in 1916 used fractional vacuum distillation on liver oil of various species of deep sea sharks, finding its formula was actually C_{30}H_{50}. It was especially concentrated in liver oil of the Squalidae, leading to the name squalene.

In 1931, Karrer and Helfenstein synthesized squalene from farnesyl bromide, thus determining its structure.

== Role in triterpenoid synthesis ==
Squalene is a biochemical precursor to both steroids and hopanoids. For sterols, the squalene conversion begins with oxidation (via squalene monooxygenase) of one of its terminal double bonds, resulting in 2,3-oxidosqualene. It then undergoes an enzyme-catalysed cyclisation to produce lanosterol, which can be elaborated into other steroids such as cholesterol and ergosterol in a multistep process by the removal of three methyl groups, the reduction of one double bond by NADPH and the migration of the other double bond. In many plants, this is then converted into stigmasterol, while in many fungi, it is the precursor to ergosterol.

The biosynthetic pathway is found in many bacteria, and most eukaryotes, though has not been found in Archaea.

== Production ==
=== Biosynthesis ===
Squalene is biosynthesised by coupling two molecules of farnesyl pyrophosphate. The condensation requires NADPH and the enzyme squalene synthase.

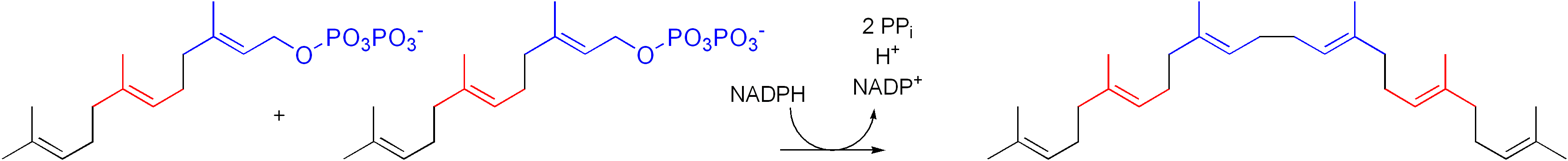
Click on genes, proteins and metabolites below to link to respective articles. (Note: The interactive pathway map can be edited at WikiPathways: "Statin_Pathway_WP430".)

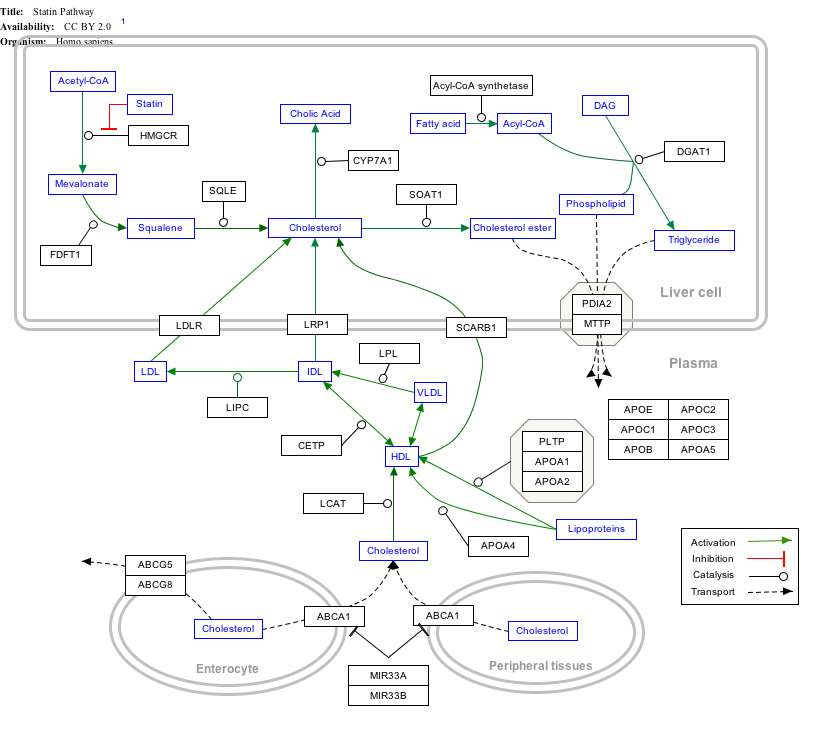

Statin pathway edit

== Sources ==
=== Shark ===
Among natural sources of squalene, the liver oil of certain deep-water (500 m and below) sharks is the most concentrated, up to 50% to 80%.

In 2020, conservationists raised concerns about the potential slaughter of sharks to obtain squalene for a COVID-19 vaccine. Environmental and other concerns over shark hunting have motivated its extraction from other sources.

=== Plants ===
Plant oils are generally squalene-poor. In terms of concentration by oil-weight, amaranth oil has the highest weight concentration of squalene (1-7%), followed by olive oil (0.2-0.5%). Distillation can increase squalene concentration. Deodorized and distilled olive oil is 28% squalene by weight.

Because squalene is thermolabile, direct distillation of vegetable oils would not concentrate squalene. Liquid–liquid extraction by organic solvents, such as hexane, chloroform, or methanol, is not suitable for producing squalene for cosmetics, food, and other products due to their toxicity. Supercritical extraction with carbon dioxide does not have such a problem, as squalene is extracted from oil, rather than from seeds.

=== Microbes ===
Genetically engineered microbes have been used to produce squalene.

=== Synthesis ===
Synthetic squalene is prepared commercially from geranylacetone.

== Uses ==
=== As an adjuvant in vaccines ===
Immunologic adjuvants are substances, administered in conjunction with a vaccine, that stimulate the immune system and increase the response to the vaccine. Squalene is not itself an adjuvant, but it has been used in conjunction with surfactants in certain adjuvant formulations.

An adjuvant using squalene is Seqirus' proprietary MF59, which is added to influenza vaccines to help stimulate the human body's immune response through production of CD4 memory cells. It is the first oil-in-water influenza vaccine adjuvant to be commercialised in combination with a seasonal influenza virus vaccine. It was developed in the 1990s by researchers at Ciba-Geigy and Chiron; both companies were subsequently acquired by Novartis. The Influenza vaccine business of Novartis was later acquired by CSL Bering and created the company Seqirus. It is present in the form of an emulsion and is added to make the vaccine more immunogenic. However, the mechanism of action remains unknown. MF59 is capable of switching on a number of genes that partially overlap with those activated by other adjuvants. How these changes are triggered is unclear; to date, no receptors responding to MF59 have been identified. One possibility is that MF59 affects the cell behaviour by changing the lipid metabolism, namely by inducing accumulation of neutral lipids within the target cells. An influenza vaccine called FLUAD which used MF59 as an adjuvant was approved for use in the US in people 65 years of age and older, beginning with the 2016–2017 flu season.

A 2009 meta-analysis assessed data from 64 clinical trials of influenza vaccines with the squalene-containing adjuvant MF59 and compared them to the effects of vaccines with no adjuvant. The analysis reported that the adjuvated vaccines were associated with slightly lower risks of chronic diseases, but that neither type of vaccines altered the rate of autoimmune diseases; the authors concluded that their data "supports the good safety profile associated with MF59-adjuvated influenza vaccines and suggests there may be a clinical benefit over non-MF59-containing vaccines".

== Safety ==
Toxicology studies indicate that in the concentrations used in cosmetics, squalene has low acute toxicity, and is not a significant contact allergen or irritant.

The World Health Organization and the US Department of Defense have both published extensive reports that emphasise that squalene is naturally occurring, even in oils of human fingerprints. The WHO goes further to explain that squalene has been present in over 22 million flu vaccines given to patients in Europe since 1997 without significant vaccine-related adverse events.

=== Controversies ===
There have been attempts to link squalene to Gulf War syndrome, but these have been debunked, and it was later revealed that squalene was not an ingredient of the vaccines in question.
