= 1977 Russian flu =

Influenza pandemic

The 1977 Russian flu was an influenza epidemic that was first reported by the Soviet Union in 1977 and lasted until 1979. The outbreak in northern China started in May 1977, slightly earlier than that in the Soviet Union. The outbreak mostly affected a population younger than 25 or 26 years of age, and was described as mild. It was caused by an H1N1 flu strain which highly resembled a virus strain circulating worldwide from 1946 to 1957. Genetic analysis and several unusual characteristics of the 1977 Russian flu have prompted many researchers to say that the virus was released to the public through a laboratory accident, or resulted from a live-vaccine trial escape. The World Health Organization, however, ruled out a laboratory origin in 1978 after discussions with researchers in the Soviet Union and China.

The Russian flu first reached the United Kingdom in 1977, and the United States in January 1978. The first outbreak in the United States took place in Cheyenne, Wyoming, and more than 70% of those infected were students. The flu spread in schools and military bases throughout the United States, but most of those infected were below the age of 26. In the United States, the death rate in affected individuals was low.

== History of outbreak ==
In May 1977, an outbreak of flu took place in northern China including Liaoning, Jilin and Tianjin. The strain was isolated and determined by Chinese researchers to be H1N1, which mostly affected students in middle and primary schools who lacked immunity to H1N1 virus. Clinical symptoms were relatively mild. Other areas in mainland China and Hong Kong were also affected in the following months.

In the same year, the H1N1 strain was detected in Siberia shortly after the outbreak in China, and then spread rapidly across the Soviet Union, which was the first country to report the outbreak to the World Health Organization (the People's Republic of China was not a member of WHO until 1981). Therefore, the outbreak was named "Russian flu".

In 1977, Russian flu reached the United Kingdom. The virus reached the United States in January 1978. The first outbreak in the U.S. was reported in a high school in Cheyenne, where the clinical attack rate was more than 70% but involved solely students. Even though infections were seen in schools and military bases throughout the U.S., there were few reports of infection in people older than 26, and the death rate in affected individuals was low.

Since late 1977, the H1N1 strain has begun to co-circulate with the H3N2 strain in humans, as seasonal flu.

== Virology ==
There have been various H1N1 strains. The 1918 Spanish flu was caused by an H1N1 strain, and H1N1 strains afterwards became endemic and circulated around the world until 1957, when they all but vanished. (There were some isolated reports of other H1N1 strains such as the one in the early 1960s.) H1N1 reappeared in 1977 and the strain of the Russian flu was almost identical to one that had been isolated in 1950. This feature of the 1977 strain has been interpreted as pointing towards an anthropogenic origin of the virus, and the epidemic is the only documented human epidemic believed uncontroversially to result from research activity.

- It has been suggested by many researchers that the virus leaked to the public from a laboratory accident. The virus may have escaped from a lab attempting to prepare an attenuated H1N1 vaccine in response to 1976 swine flu outbreak of 1976. The World Health Organization, however, ruled out a laboratory origin in 1978 after discussions with researchers in the Soviet Union and China: their report stated that "the laboratories concerned either had never kept H1N1 virus or had not worked with it for a long time".
- Others have suggested that it resulted from a vaccine trial or challenge. The multiple source locations of outbreak made a single-laboratory origin less likely than a vaccine accident. Virologist Peter Palese claims the outbreak was the "result of vaccine trials in the Far East involving the challenge of several thousand military recruits with live H1N1," according to personal communication with virologist Chi-Ming Chu.
- The idea that the virus may have been a deliberately-deployed bioweapon appears unlikely and inconsistent with Soviet biological weapon research at the time.
- In February 2021, some researchers suggested that this virus might have been engineered via serial passage, referring to the original study of 1981.

== Clinical statistics ==
The Russian flu was relatively benign. In 1977, Chinese researchers found uneven attack rates among different groups of students, as well as many mild and asymptomatic infections. In the United States, some researchers estimate the influenza mortality rate (not the infection fatality rate or the case fatality rate) around 5 in every 100,000 population, less than that of the typical seasonal influenza (~6 in every 100,000 population). Most of the infected people were under the age of 26 or 25, presumably because older people retained immunity from exposure to previous H1N1 strains.

Contradicting these descriptions, one review article proposed that 700,000 people died due to the Russian flu worldwide and that the virus was "Identical with the "Spanish flu" virus".

== See also ==
- COVID-19 lab leak theory
- Influenza
- List of epidemics
- 1976 swine flu outbreak
- 2006 H5N1 outbreak in India
- 2007 Australian equine influenza outbreak
- 2007 Bernard Matthews H5N1 outbreak
- 2008 H5N1 outbreak in West Bengal
- 2015 United States H5N2 outbreak
- 2020–2023 H5N8 outbreak
