= Social effects of H5N1 =

Effects of H5N1 influenza on human society

See Influenza pandemic for government preparation for an H5N1 pandemic

The social impact of H5N1 is the effect or influence of H5N1 in human society.

== Financial ==
On November 1, 2005, US President George W. Bush unveiled the National Strategy To Safeguard Against The Danger of Pandemic Influenza backed by a request to Congress for $7.1 billion to begin implementing the plan.

On January 18, 2006, donor nations had pledged two billion US dollars to combat bird flu at the two-day International Pledging Conference on Avian and Human Influenza held in China.

According to The New York Times, due to the H5N1 threat, as of March 2006: "governments worldwide have spent billions planning for a potential influenza pandemic: buying medicines, running disaster drills, [and] developing strategies for tighter border controls."

Investment strategies are being altered to manage the effects of H5N1. This changes the valuations of trillions of dollars' worth of stocks worldwide as investors move assets in accordance with both fears and hopes.

Poultry farming practices have changed due to H5N1:

- killing millions of poultry
- vaccinating poultry against bird flu
- vaccinating poultry workers against human flu
- limiting travel in areas where H5N1 is found
- increasing farm hygiene
- reducing contact between livestock and wild birds
- reducing open-air wet markets
- limiting workers contact with cock fighting
- reducing purchases of live fowl
- improving veterinary vaccine availability and cost.

For example, after nearly two years of using mainly culling to control the virus, the Vietnam government in 2005 adopted a combination of mass poultry vaccination, disinfecting, culling, information campaigns and bans on live poultry in cities.

The cost of poultry farming has increased, while the cost to consumers has gone down due to fears from H5N1 driving demand below supply, resulting in devastating losses for many poultry farmers. Poor poultry farmers can't afford mandated measures keeping their bird livestock from contact with wild birds (and other measures) thus risking losing their livelihood altogether. Multinational poultry farming is increasingly becoming a profit loser as H5N1 achieves status as endemic in wild birds worldwide.

Financial ruin for poor poultry farmers, that can be as severe as threatening starvation, has caused some to commit suicide and many others to stop cooperating with efforts to deal with H5N1; further increasing the human toll, the spread of the disease and the chances for a pandemic mutation.

== Political ==
US HHS Secretary Michael O. Leavitt has said "Everything you say in advance of a pandemic is alarmist; anything you do after it starts is inadequate."

H5N1, like many other topics, is subject to political spin; wherein every interest group picks and chooses among the facts to support their favorite cause resulting in a distortion of the overall picture, the motivations of the people involved and the believability of the predictions.

Donald Rumsfeld, formerly United States Secretary of Defense, is a past board member and current minor shareholder of Gilead Sciences which owns intellectual property rights to Oseltamivir (also called "Tamiflu"). In November 2005, George W. Bush urged Congress to pass 7.1 billion in emergency funding to prepare for the possible bird flu pandemic, of which one billion is solely dedicated to the purchase, and distribution of Tamiflu.

Some believe H5N1 is a problem of industrial poultry practices.

Others have a more nuanced position. According to the CDC article H5N1 Outbreaks and Enzootic Influenza by Robert G. Webster et al.: "Transmission of highly pathogenic H5N1 from domestic poultry back to migratory waterfowl in western China has increased the geographic spread. The spread of H5N1 and its likely reintroduction to domestic poultry increase the need for good agricultural vaccines. In fact, the root cause of the continuing H5N1 pandemic threat may be the way the pathogenicity of H5N1 viruses is masked by cocirculating influenza viruses or bad agricultural vaccines." Dr. Robert Webster explains: "If you use a good vaccine you can prevent the transmission within poultry and to humans. But if they have been using vaccines now [in China] for several years, why is there so much bird flu? There is bad vaccine that stops the disease in the bird but the bird goes on pooping out virus and maintaining it and changing it. And I think this is what is going on in China. It has to be. Either there is not enough vaccine being used or there is substandard vaccine being used. Probably both. It's not just China. We can't blame China for substandard vaccines. I think there are substandard vaccines for influenza in poultry all over the world." In response to the same concerns, Reuters reports Hong Kong infectious disease expert Lo Wing-lok saying that "The issue of vaccines has to take top priority", and Julie Hall, in charge of the WHO's outbreak response in China, saying that China's vaccinations could be "masking" the virus. The BBC reported that Dr Wendy Barclay, a virologist at the University of Reading, UK said: "The Chinese have made a vaccine based on reverse genetics made with H5N1 antigens, and they have been using it. There has been a lot of criticism of what they have done, because they have protected their chickens against death from this virus but the chickens still get infected; and then you get drift - the virus mutates in response to the antibodies - and now we have a situation where we have five or six 'flavours' of H5N1 out there."

Some have called for tax breaks due to H5N1. It was reported in May 2006 that Pakistani poultry farmers sought a 10-year tax exemption to support their business due to falling demand and prices cause by detection of H5N1. "We have asked the government to give us tax exemption on income from the poultry business for at least 10 years to meet losses caused by the bird flu scare", said Abdul Basit, vice president of the Chamber of Commerce and Industry (LCCI).

== Social ==
Reuters reported that WHO expert Hassan al-Bushra said:

Even now, we remain unsure about Tamiflu's real effectiveness. As for a vaccine, work cannot start on it until the emergence of a new virus, and we predict it would take six to nine months to develop it. For the moment, we cannot by any means count on a potential vaccine to prevent the spread of a contagious influenza virus, whose various precedents in the past 90 years have been highly pathogenic. However, it is crucial that countries in the Middle East invest and start developing their own research and technical facilities, where they can produce their own drugs when the time comes rather than wait to import expensive medicines from abroad at the risk of their population.

If a pandemic occurs, local response will be more important than national or international response, as every community will have its own resources swamped dealing with its own problems. International groups, nations, local governments, corporations, schools, and groups of all kinds have made plans and run drills to prepare for an H5N1 pandemic.

Online avian flu forums have received increasing attention. Self-help groups have organized to provide news and information about resources, aid and relief efforts in preparation for avian flu.

British reports warn that in response to an influenza pandemic local groups will not be able to rely on the armed forces, widespread infection could occur in days not months, an effective vaccine can not be counted on, and the huge death toll could swamp mortuaries so "A key point for local planning is likely to be the identification of potential sites for the location of facilities for the temporary storage of bodies".

== Personal ==
Many individuals have stockpiled supplies (Tamiflu, food, water, etc.) for a possible flu pandemic.

Individuals have started web sites and companies using interest and ignorance in H5N1 to sell information, cures, and advertising space. Some even use concern over H5N1 to find victims for their malware.

A significant effect of H5N1 has been personal fear concerning the unknown, even by those most in-the-know. Dr. David Nabarro, chief avian flu coordinator for the United Nations, describes himself as "quite scared"; says avian flu has too many unanswered questions; and if the disease starts spreading to humans, borders will close, airports will shut down, and travelers everywhere will be stranded. With evaluations of the threat ranging from those who say it is a hoax to those who warn of billions of humans dying, uncertainty and fear motivate personal behaviors around the world affecting many people even before the threat becomes reality.

== Pop culture ==
The 1998 chart-topping hit song "One Week" by Barenaked Ladies includes the lines "Chickity China the Chinese chicken / Have a drumstick and your brain stops tickin'", a reference to the outbreaks of H5N1 in Hong Kong around the time the song was written.

== Compared to annual flu season ==
The annual flu season deaths and costs caused by viruses other than H5N1 provide a point of contrast - something to compare against. According to the United States Government, the annual flu in the United States:

- Resulted in approximately 36,000 deaths and more than 200,000 hospitalizations each year.
- In addition to this human toll, influenza is annually responsible for a total cost of over $10 billion in the United States.
- A pandemic, or worldwide outbreak of a new influenza virus, could dwarf this impact by overwhelming our health and medical capabilities, potentially resulting in hundreds of thousands of deaths, millions of hospitalizations, and hundreds of billions of dollars in direct and indirect costs.

The New England Journal of Medicine reported that: "A study by the Congressional Budget Office estimates that the consequences of a severe pandemic could, in the United States, include 200 million people infected, 90 million clinically ill, and 2 million dead. The study estimates that 30 percent of all workers would become ill and 2.5 percent would die, with 30 percent of workers missing a mean of three weeks of work — resulting in a decrease in the gross domestic product of 5 percent. Furthermore, 18 million to 45 million people would require outpatient care, and economic costs would total approximately $675 billion." One study concludes that a pandemic that reduced the available dock workers by 28% would cut the throughput capacity for containers arriving at American ports on the West coast by 45%.

== See also ==
- Bird flu in India
- Fatal Contact: Bird Flu in America (2006 film)
- Fujian flu
- Influenza Genome Sequencing Project
- International Partnership on Avian and Pandemic Influenza
- Disease surveillance
- Pandemic Severity Index
