= 2020–2023 H5N8 outbreak =

Outbreak of Avian influenza in poultry farms and wild birds

In the early 2020s, an ongoing outbreak of avian influenza subtype H5N8 has been occurring at poultry farms and among wild bird populations in several countries and continents, leading to the subsequent cullings of millions of birds to prevent a pandemic similar to that of the H5N1 outbreak in 2008. The first case of human transmission of avian flu, also known as bird flu, was reported by Russian authorities in February 2021, as several poultry farm workers tested positive for the virus.

The H5N8 outbreak was marked by a H5 hemagglutinin (HA) of the 2.3.4.4b lineage. A virus with this lineage of HA gene, either H5N8 or H5N6, would later give rise to a H5N1 virus after reassortment (genetic "swapping") with an influenza virus with N1 in nature, the culprit for the 2020–2025 H5N1 outbreak. The 2.3.4.4 lineage originated in China in 2008 and has dominated the global scene since 2014. The 2.3.4.4b sub-lineage became highly noteworthy among birds in 2016. The initial outbreaks in 2016–2020 were mostly due to H5N8, after which the H5N1 form became more significant. It also lead to some smaller outbreaks with other types of the neuroamidase (N) gene.

== Outbreak ==
=== Early outbreak in Saudi Arabia ===
On 4 February 2020, the Saudi Arabian government reported an outbreak of the highly pathogenic H5N8 virus on a poultry farm. The outbreak, which occurred in the central Sudair region, killed more than 22,000 birds in a few weeks.

=== H5N8 spreads to Russia and Central Asia ===
In the summer months, H5N8 was detected in wild birds in western Russia and Kazakhstan. Because this included waterbirds that migrate into northern and western Europe, it was considered likely that the virus would be detected there later in the year (as would be confirmed in October–November).

=== International spread in late 2020 and early 2021 ===
On 22 October, the agriculture minister Carola Schouten of the Netherlands confirmed that H5N8 had been found in samples from wild birds in the country. As a countermeasure, it was required that birds in poultry farms were kept indoors and isolated. From late October to mid-November, it had spread to three chicken farms and a duck farm in the country, and the 320,000 birds in the farms had been eradicated to stop the spread. Shortly after the first detection in the Netherlands, it was confirmed in the United Kingdom (October: poultry; November: wild birds and poultry), Germany (October: wild birds; November: wild birds and poultry), Republic of Ireland (October and November: wild birds), Belgium (November: wild birds), Denmark (November: wild birds and poultry), France (November: poultry) and Sweden (November: poultry). These outbreaks resulted in countermeasures that were similar to those already taken in the Netherlands.

Outbreaks of highly pathogenic H5N8 occurred in Japan from November 2020 to March 2021 on 52 poultry farms.

On 10 November, South Korea's agriculture ministry said it had confirmed the highly pathogenic H5N8 strain of bird flu in samples from wild birds in the central west of the country and issued its bird flu warning.

On 27 November, China's agriculture ministry reported that H5N8 had been found in wild swans in Shanxi, while Norway detected its first case of the highly pathogenic H5N8 strain of bird flu in wild geese in Sandnes municipality, prompting the Norwegian Food Safety Authority to introduce a regional ban on outdoor poultry.

On 30 November, South Korea reported an outbreak of pathogenic H5N8 avian influenza at a farm in Jeongeup, North Jeolla Province, killing over 19,000 ducks.

==== 2021 outbreaks ====
The H5N8 avian influenza was reported in two districts of Indian state of Kerala in early January 2021 which killed hundreds of birds in late December 2020. Thousands of birds were culled. Avian influenza outbreaks of unknown subtypes were later also reported in five other states of India. 160,000 birds in two poultry farms in Barwala, Panchkula and Raipur Rani are to be culled. 437,000 birds died in this poultry belt between mid-December and 8 January 2021. By 9 January 2021, seven states confirmed the outbreak.

On 15 January, authorities in Namibia suspended the importation and transit of poultry from European countries where an outbreak of the Avian influenza subtype H5N8 has been reported.

On 20 January, Iraq reported an outbreak of highly pathogenic H5N8 bird flu on a farm in the city of Samarra, which killed 63,700 birds out of the 68,800-strong flock, according to the Paris-based World Organisation for Animal Health (OIE). The remaining birds were subsequently culled.

On 1 February, the Ministry of Agriculture and Rural Affairs of China reported an outbreak of highly pathogenic H5N8 in wild Swans at the Winter Palace, Beijing.

On 2 February, authorities in Brandenburg, Germany, culled 14,000 turkeys on a farm due to a confirmed outbreak of H5N8 in the Uckermark area.

On 9 February, Algeria reported an outbreak of H5N8 on a poultry farm in the town of Aïn Fakroun. The outbreak killed 50,000 birds, with the remaining 1,200 birds in the flock being culled, according to a report from the Agriculture Ministry.

Afghanistan reported an outbreak of H5N8 bird flu on a poultry farm in Herat Province on 25 February. The outbreak killed 794 birds, while the remaining 22,000-strong flock were subsequently culled, according to the World Organisation for Animal Health.

Warwickshire, UK reported an outbreak on 8 November 2021. A 3 km protection zone and a 10 km surveillance zone have been established.

Avian flu was detected at a poultry farm in Akita Prefecture in northeastern Japan, prompting the culling of roughly 143,000 chickens, according to the prefectural government on 10 November 2021.

==== 2022 outbreaks ====
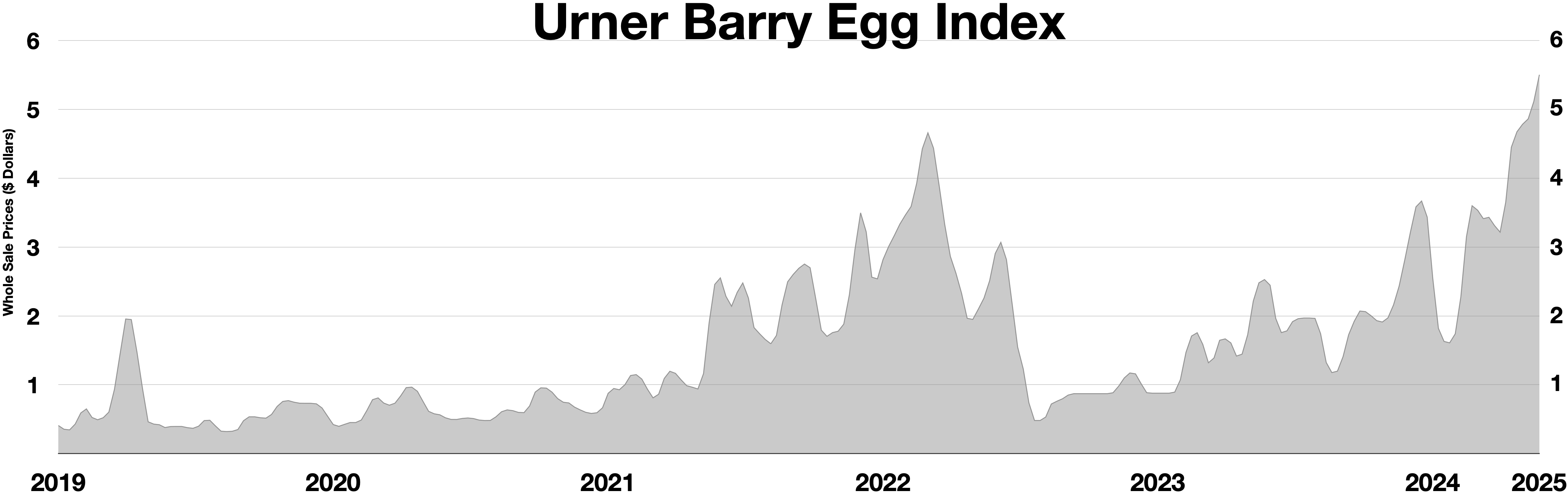
Urner Barry index of egg prices in the United States, 2019–2023

From February to April 2022, avian flu outbreaks in United States have resulted in the culling of more than 22.8 million birds in 24 states.

Avian flu has affected England. In Norfolk, Suffolk and parts of Essex, poultry has been mandated to be kept indoors after the affected areas were placed in an Avian Influenza Prevention Zone.

In October 2022, wildlife experts patrolling the Norfolk Broads were looking for swans that showed signs of being ill and had to euthanatize them on the spot.

==== 2023 outbreaks ====
In the beginning of the year, an outbreak of H5N8 began in Argentina. In February 2023, Argentina confirmed its first poultry case in Río Negro Province and decided to suspend poultry exports due to the case. By that date, other 25 cases had been detected in wild birds across the country.

=== Human cases confirmed ===
On 20 February 2021, Russian authorities reported the first known human cases of H5N8 as seven farm workers tested positive. There is no evidence of human-to-human transmission and the cases were described as "mild" or asymptomatic. The World Health Organization was notified.

== See also ==
- 2015 United States H5N2 outbreak
- 2008 H5N1 outbreak in West Bengal
- 2007 Bernard Matthews H5N1 outbreak
- 2006 H5N1 outbreak in India
