= Russian flu =

Russian flu may refer to:

- 1889–1890 flu pandemic
- 1977 Russian flu
- 1998 Russian financial crisis
- Russian Flu (film), a 1937 Swedish comedy film
- "The Russian Flu", Northern Exposure episode
