= Influenza A virus subtype H5N2 =

Virus classification
- (unranked): Virus
- Realm: Riboviria
- Kingdom: Orthornavirae
- Phylum: Negarnaviricota
- Class: Insthoviricetes
- Order: Articulavirales
- Family: Orthomyxoviridae
- Genus: Alphainfluenzavirus
- Species: Influenza A virus
- Serotype: Influenza A virus subtype H5N2

Virus subtype

H5 N2 is a subtype of the species Influenzavirus A (avian influenza virus or bird flu virus). The subtype infects a wide variety of birds, including chickens, ducks, turkeys, falcons, and ostriches. Affected birds usually do not appear ill, and the disease is often mild as avian influenza viral subtypes go. Some variants of the subtype are much more pathogenic than others, and outbreaks of "high-path" H5N2 result in the culling of thousands of birds in poultry farms from time to time. It appears that people who work with birds can be infected by the virus, but suffer hardly any noticeable health effects. Even people exposed to the highly pathogenic H5N2 variety that killed ostrich chicks in South Africa only seem to have developed conjunctivitis, or a perhaps a mild respiratory illness. There is no evidence of human-to-human spread of H5N2. On November 12, 2005 it was reported that a falcon was found to have H5N2. On June 5, 2024, the first confirmed human case of H5N2 was reported in Mexico.

== Vaccine ==
In China, inactivated H5N2 has been effectively used as a poultry vaccine for H5N1.

== Epidemiology ==
=== Russia ===
In December 2017, the Paris-based World Organisation for Animal Health (OIE) announced that the Russian ministry of agriculture detected highly pathogenic H5N2 that led to the culling of more than 660,000 birds in Kostroma Oblast, Central Federal District. Owners reported that the chickens stopped breathing and their combs became bluish. The factory was affected by the virus at least twice during the year. The investigation later found that the forage wasn't thermally disinfected before dispersion and water was of low quality.

=== South Korea ===
In Korea, ducks have been destroyed at the farm since quarantine officials detected the suspected low pathogenic H5N2 strain of avian influenza on December 1, 2004.

=== Japan ===
In Japan, H5N2 virus was isolated or an anti-H5 antibody was identified from chickens in 40 chicken farms in Ibaraki Prefecture and in one chicken farm in Saitama Prefecture from June through December 2005. The strain was named as A/ chicken /Ibaraki/1/2005(H5N2). About 5.7 million birds were destroyed in Ibaraki following the H5N2 outbreaks.

=== Taiwan ===
In Taiwan, an outbreak of H5N2 was confirmed in December 2008.

In March 2012, the first documented occurrence in Taiwan of highly pathogenic avian influenza H5N2 was reported to the World Organization for Animal Health (OIE). The outbreak began in February 2012.

=== Sri Lanka ===
In Sri Lanka outbreak of H5N2 in Bingiriya have been confirmed by the Health Ministry in January 2012. Around 5000-6000 chicken were destroyed, after some of them were confirmed having infected with H5N2.

=== South Africa ===
In 2006, an H5N2 outbreak on a single farm in South Africa resulted in the destruction of all its sixty ostriches. The strain was similar to the one that caused outbreaks in South Africa 2004/2005.

In 2012 a strain of highly pathogenic avian influenza is devastating the South African commercial ostrich industry with 41,000 birds already been reported culled.

=== United States ===
Low pathogenic avian influenza H5N2 virus in poultry later gained accentuated virulence in the United States and Mexico. A highly pathogenic strain of H5N2 caused flu outbreaks with significant spread to numerous farms, resulting in great economic losses in 1983 in Pennsylvania, USA in chickens and turkeys, in 1994 in Mexico in chickens and a minor outbreak in 1997 in Italy in chickens.

In February 2004, an outbreak occurred in Texas and the affected flock was culled without any further transmission.

In 2007, a low-pathogenic strain of H5N2 was found in samples collected from 25,000 turkeys in West Virginia in a routine testing prior to their slaughter. The birds showed no sign of illness or mortality. Measures were taken to prevent the virus from mutating and spreading.

In 2015, an outbreak of H5N2 was identified in a series of chicken and turkey farming operations in the Midwestern region of the United States. Around 50.5 million birds were killed by the disease or via mass killing methods (primarily foam depopulation) in an attempt to contain the outbreak. Nearly 30 million were killed in Iowa alone, the nation's largest egg producer.

In January 2017, the US Department of Agriculture announced that H5N2 was discovered on a duck in Fergus County, Montana.

=== Canada ===
In February 2009, a commercial turkey farm in Abbottsford, British Columbia (the Fraser Valley) was struck with a H5N2 outbreak, and 36 sites were quarantined as precautionary measure.

In July 2016, a duck farm "near St. Catharines, Ontario" was the site of an outbreak of H5N2. The CFIA directed the biological heat treatment of the compost at the infected premises to ensure that a reservoir for the virus was destroyed.

=== Caribbean ===
In late 2007 (December 21), an H5N2 outbreak was found in the Dominican Republic. 15 roosters and 2 hens were eliminated even though they had no visible sign of infection.

In October 2017, the Dominican Department of Agriculture announced that H5N2 was discovered on several chicken in Moca, Dominican Republic, in a northern province of the country.

In May and June 2008, there were three outbreaks of low-pathogenic H5N2 avian flu in birds at three locations in the central, northern, and southern parts of Haiti.

== H5N2 and humans ==
=== Japan ===
Japan's Health Ministry said in January, 2006 that poultry farm workers in Ibaraki prefecture may have been exposed to H5N2 (which was not previously known to infect humans) in 2005. Data were collected from 257 workers at 35 chicken farms by Ibaraki prefectural government. It was determined that their H5N2 antibody titers after the outbreak were significantly higher than those collected prior to the outbreak.

=== Mexico ===
On June 5, 2024, the World Health Organization recognized the first laboratory-confirmed case of H5N2 in a human in Mexico in a patient who died. Health officials in Mexico stated that the source of the infection had not been identified. Scientists said that the infection was unrelated to the 2020–2024 H5N1 outbreak. It was also reported that the patient had been bedridden for three weeks before contracting the illness. However, on June 7, Mexican health officials stated that the patient's death was caused by chronic diseases, and not by H5N2.
