= Chi-Ming Chu =

Chinese virologist

Chi-Ming Chu (Zhu Jiming)
- 朱既明
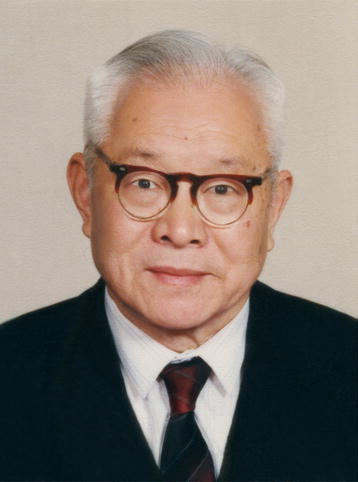
- Born: September 12, 1917; Yixing, Jiangsu, China
- Died: January 6, 1998 (aged 80)
- Education: Shanghai Medical College, University of Cambridge
- Occupation: Virologist
- Years active: 1945–1984
- Known for: Heading the World Influenza Centre; Discovering the filamentous form of the influenza virus; Discovering the origins of the 1957 influenza pandemic; Discovering the origins of the 1977 influenza pandemic

Zhu Jiming (Chinese: 朱既明; 12 September 1917 – 6 January 1998), better known in English as Chi-Ming Chu, was a Chinese virologist. He was a member of the Chinese Academy of Science and an Honorary Member of the American Society for Microbiology.

== Early life and education ==
Chu was born 12 September 1917 in Yixing, Jiangsu, China. He attended Shanghai Medical College and graduated in 1939. He gained his PhD in 1948 from Cambridge University.

== Career ==
Chu's career spanned from classical virology to the era of molecular virology. His research on influenza viruses included work on virus structure, surveillance and subunit vaccine development. He also worked on penicillin, attenuated viral vaccines, recombinant hepatitis B virus (HBV) vaccines and vaccinia viral vectors.

Chu was the first head of the World Influenza Centre (WIC) at the National Institute for Medical Research at Mill Hill (London) from 1948 to 1950. The WIC was established by the World Health Organisation as a result of a meeting at the 4th International Congress of Microbiology, held in 1947. After returning to China in 1950 he worked at the National Vaccine and Serum Institute (Beijing) before moving to the National Institute of Biologicals in Changchun and then the Chinese Academy of Preventive Medicine (CAPM).

At the end of his life Dr. Chu was a member of the Chinese Academy of Science, an Academician of the British Royal Institute for Internal Medicine, an Honorary Member of the American Society for Microbiology and Honorary Director of the Institute of Virology.

Chu was engaged in influenza virus research from 1945 to 1984. Among his contributions, Dr. Chu discovered the filamentous form of influenza virus and was the first to report its variability in Lancet in 1949. Chu's work on influenza viruses was important for later work on virus detection and the worldwide program of influenza virus surveillance. He discovered the Chu inhibitor, the filamentous property of influenza viruses, and the origins of the 1957 and 1977 influenza pandemics. He appeared in a 1997 documentary explaining his research.

Chi-Ming Chu's personal motto was “Only by simplifying your everyday life and suppressing your desire for material things can you reach your goals. Only a calm mind and absence of anxiety will grant you broad vision”.
