= Influenza A virus subtype H5N8 =

Virus classification
- (unranked): Virus
- Realm: Riboviria
- Kingdom: Orthornavirae
- Phylum: Negarnaviricota
- Class: Insthoviricetes
- Order: Articulavirales
- Family: Orthomyxoviridae
- Genus: Alphainfluenzavirus
- Species: Influenza A virus
- Serotype: Influenza A virus subtype H5N8

Subtype of Influenza A virus, also known as Avian or Bird Flu

H5N8 is a subtype of the influenza A virus, which causes the disease avian influenza (often referred to as "bird flu") and is highly lethal to wild birds and poultry. H5N8 is typically not associated with humans. However, seven people in Russia were found to be infected in 2021, becoming the first documented human cases.

== Virus and symptoms ==
The H5N8 virus manifests itself in various ways, from asymptomatic and sub-clinical to highly lethal in some populations. Many of the findings in wild birds are based on the discovery of dead animals. Its intravenous pathogenicity index (IVPI) is greater than 1.2, giving it a mortality rate of at least 75 percent.

H5N8 has previously been used in place of the highly pathogenic H5N1 in studies.

== Outbreaks ==
=== 1983 ===
Perhaps the most known outbreak of H5N8 occurred in Ireland in 1983. Poultry on two farms showed the usual symptoms, plus diarrhea, nervousness, and depression. Poultry farms within close proximity soon began to show signs of infection, as well, but no contact between the farms could be established. In the end, 8,000 turkeys, 28,020 chickens, and 270,000 ducks were culled. When investigated in the lab, clinical findings demonstrated that turkeys were the most susceptible to infection. The virus could not be clinically reproduced in ducks.

=== 2014 ===
An outbreak of H5N8 was reported in breeding ducks in North Jeolla Province, South Korea, on 18 January 2014. The virus spread in duck and chicken farms and at least 12 million poultry were culled.

=== 2016–17 ===
In the second half of 2016, an H5N8 outbreak was first reported in Europe, spreading to Asia by the end of the year.

==== October 2016 ====
On 27 October 2016, an H5N8 case was first reported in a wild swan in Hungary. Further reports were subsequently made from seven additional European countries. There were outbreaks in poultry and wild birds in Austria, Hungary, and Germany. There were reports of infection in wild birds only in Croatia, Denmark, Poland, and Switzerland.

==== November 2016 ====
In the Netherlands, H5N8 was found in wild birds and birds in a zoo and on 26 November 190,000 ducks were destroyed at six farms. Outbreaks have also been reported in India, Israel, South Korea, Taiwan and Russia.

==== December 2016 ====
On 16 December 2016, it was confirmed that there was an outbreak of the H5N8 virus at a farm near Tetney, Louth — the first outbreak in the United Kingdom. This outbreak has caused the combined death and culling of 5,000 turkeys. At the time of writing (16 December 2016), a 3 km protection zone and a 10 km surveillance zone were enforced by the Department for Environment, Food and Rural Affairs.

In the second week of December official delegations from Japan, South Korea and China gathered in Beijing for a symposium on preventing and controlling bird flu and other diseases in East Asia, according to the website of China's ministry of agriculture.

By the end of December the outbreak had spread to South Korea, Japan, Germany, and the United Kingdom. Thousands of birds and animals were being culled in Germany to stop the spread. In the United Kingdom the flu was found in a wild duck at a turkey farm in Lincolnshire.

In South Korea, a record total of 18.4 million birds had been killed by December since the first outbreak of avian flu was reported at a farm on Nov. 18.

Japan has reported five outbreaks since the end of November with 800,000 chickens having been culled in one month.

==== January 2017 ====
In early January 2017, France culled about 800,000 birds to prevent the spread of H5N8. In Nigeria, it was reported that the virus affected 3.5 million birds. The virus was also detected in Spain and Slovenia.

Uganda detected aves flu in two locations, one affecting wild birds and another striking domestic birds.

==== February 2017 ====
Two cases of the virus were detected in Northern Ireland amongst wild geese. As a response, the Department of Agriculture extended restrictions on poultry flocks until at least 16 March.

==== June 2017 ====
A case of the virus was detected in Harare, Zimbabwe at one of the major poultry producers, Irvine's Private Limited. The virus saw over 7,000 birds succumbing to the virus. As a result, the company, culled over 140,000 birds to prevent the spread of the virus. Even though a ban on all avian products from Zimbabwe was issued, on 22 June an outbreak was reported at a commercial broiler poultry farm outside Villiers, South Africa after 5,000 chickens died. A few days later, just over 60 km away from the first outbreak, a separate outbreak was reported in Standerton, Mpumalanga, where over 25,000 birds were culled to prevent the virus spreading. The South African Poultry Association reported that wild ducks migrating from Europe are spreading the virus.

==== December 2017 ====
On 20 December 2017, the Ministry of Environment, Water and Agriculture (MEWA) in Saudi Arabia announced the detection of the highly pathogenic H5N8 virus among birds at a poultry market in Riyadh. A few days later, the virus was detected in other farms in other cities including Al-Ahsa, Al-Kharj, Al-Quaiyat, Dharma, and Mazahmiya. This outbreak in the country led to a cull of more than 100,000 birds at 12 locations across the country to prevent the spread of the virus.

=== 2020 ===
==== February ====
On 4 February, Saudi Arabia reported an outbreak of the highly pathogenic H5N8 bird flu virus on a poultry farm. The outbreak, which occurred in the central Sudair region, killed 22,700 birds.

==== Summer ====
In the summer of 2020, H5N8 was detected in wild birds in western Russia and Kazakhstan. Because this included waterbirds that migrate into northern and western Europe, it was considered likely that the virus would be detected there later in the year (as would be confirmed in October–November).

==== October–December ====
On 22 October, the agriculture minister Carola Schouten of the Netherlands confirmed that H5N8 had been found in samples from wild birds in the country. As a countermeasure, it was required that birds in poultry farms were kept indoors and isolated. From late October to mid-November, it had spread to three chicken farms and a duck farm in the country, and the 320,000 birds in the farms had been eradicated to stop the spread. Shortly after the first detection in the Netherlands, it was confirmed in the United Kingdom (October: poultry; November: wild birds and poultry), Germany (October: wild birds; November: wild birds and poultry), Ireland (October and November: wild birds), Belgium (November: wild birds), Denmark (November: wild birds and poultry), France (November: poultry) and Sweden (November: poultry). These outbreaks resulted in countermeasures that were similar to those already taken in the Netherlands.

According to official confirmed reports from the Ministry of Agriculture Forestry and Fisheries of Japan, multiple dead chickens were found in 49 chicken poultry farms in Japan, from 5 November 2020 to 25 February 2021, 16 places in Shikoku Island, 15 places in Kyushu Island, ten places in Kantō region, five places in western Honshu and each one place in Awaji Island, Gifu Prefecture, and Toyama Prefecture. According to local official confirmed report, these cases were highly pathogenic H5N8 type flu.

On 10 November, South Korea's agriculture ministry said it had confirmed the highly pathogenic H5N8 strain of bird flu in samples from wild birds in the central west of the country and issued its bird flu warning.

At the end of November 2020, about 10,500 turkeys were killed on a British farm in North Yorkshire in order to limit the spread of H5N8 bird flu after health officials discovered an outbreak.

On 16 December several birds were found dead on the Isle of Wight, in the UK, and the cause of death was identified as H5N8.

=== 2021 ===
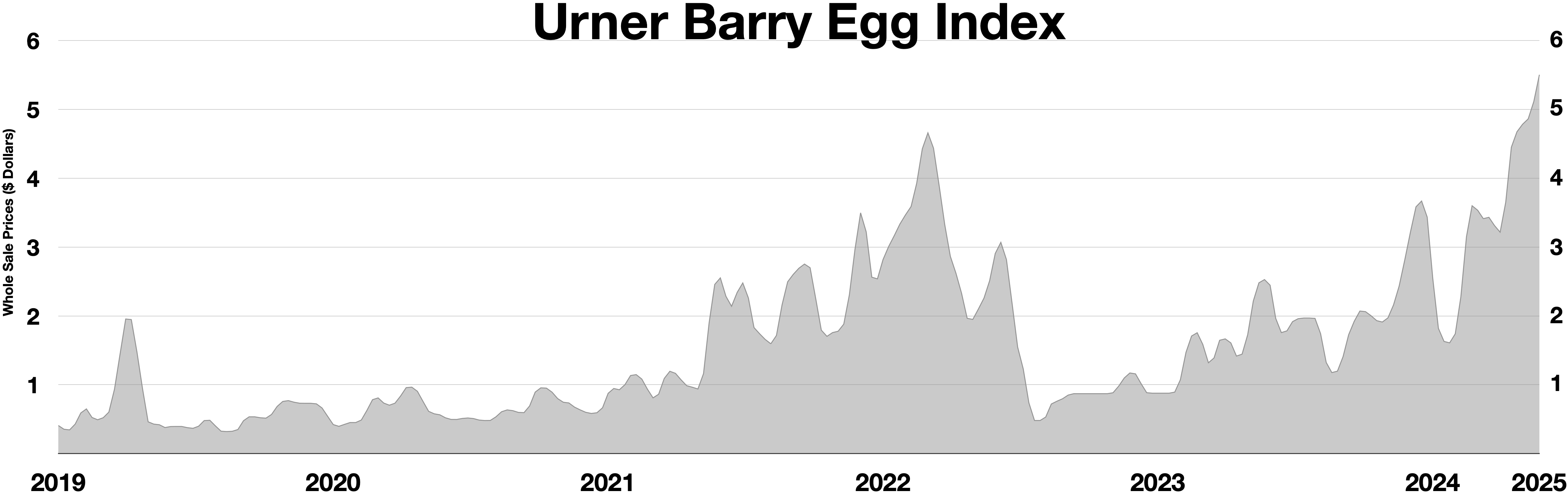
Urner Barry index of egg prices in the United States, 2019-2023

==== January ====
India reported the virus first in the migratory birds following which in January 2021 culling of chickens and ducks began on Tuesday 6 Jan in parts of Kerala to contain the H5N8 strain of bird flu, while Jammu and Kashmir sounded an alert and started collecting samples from migratory species after Himachal Pradesh, Rajasthan and Madhya Pradesh reported cases of avian influenza. Kerala officials have said around 40,000 domestic birds, including 34,000 in the Kuttanad region alone, will be culled to check the spread of the H5N8 virus. Till now, 2,700 migratory birds, mostly bar-headed geese, have been found dead in the lake area and samples have been sent for testing, state animal husbandry officials said.

According to Japan's Ministry of Agriculture, Forestry and Fisheries official report, several dead edible ducks were found in two poultry farms near Narita, Chiba Prefecture. Both cases were confirmed as H5N8 type bird flu via genetic test by a regional official on 21 January and 24. 5400 ducks were culled in response.

As a larger nationwide trend in avian flu, 7 million poultry were culled with aid from the Japan Ground Self-Defense Force as of February 17, 2021.

==== February ====
On 20 February 2021, Russia reported the first known cases of H5N8 in humans. Seven people were confirmed to have been infected at a farm in southern Russia where outbreaks had been reported. There was no indication of human-to-human transmission and the seven cases were described as "mild." Anna Popova, head of Rospotrebnadzor, has said the seven poultry workers have since recovered, and that "the situation did not develop further." WHO later confirmed that all cases remained asymptomatic for the whole follow-up.

==== March ====
In an interview published in The Moscow Times on 12 March 2021, Popova warned that there was a "high degree of probability" of human-to-human transmission of H5N8.

=== 2024 ===
==== December ====
In December 2024 an outbreak was reported in Canada, causing a legal, political, and social issue.
