= International Conference on Emerging Infectious Diseases =

The International Conference on Emerging Infectious Diseases (ICEID) is a conference for public health professionals on the subject of emerging infectious diseases.

From CDC page for ICEID:

The International Conference on Emerging Infectious Diseases was first convened in 1998; ICEID 2006 marks its fifth occurrence. The conference brings together public health professional to encourage the exchange of scientific and public health information on global emerging infectious disease issues. The program will include plenary and panel sessions with invited speakers as well as oral and poster presentations on emerging infections. Major topics include current work on surveillance, epidemiology, research, communication and training, bioterrorism, and preventions and control of emerging infectious diseases, both in the United States and abroad.

== 2006 conference ==
Major subjects covered include:

- Antimicrobial Resistance
- Bioterrorism and Preparedness
- Foodborne and Waterborne Illnesses
- Global Health
- Molecular Diagnostics and Epidemiology
- Nosocomial Infections
- Socio-economic and Political Factors
- Vector-borne Diseases
- Zoonotic Diseases

From Yahoo news report:

Speaking to the International Conference on Emerging Infectious Diseases in Atlanta, Garten said the pool of H5N1 candidates with the potential to cause a human influenza pandemic is getting more genetically diverse, which makes studying the virus more complex and heightens the need for increased surveillance. "As the virus continues its geographic expansion, it is also undergoing genetic diversity expansion," Garten said in a statement.
