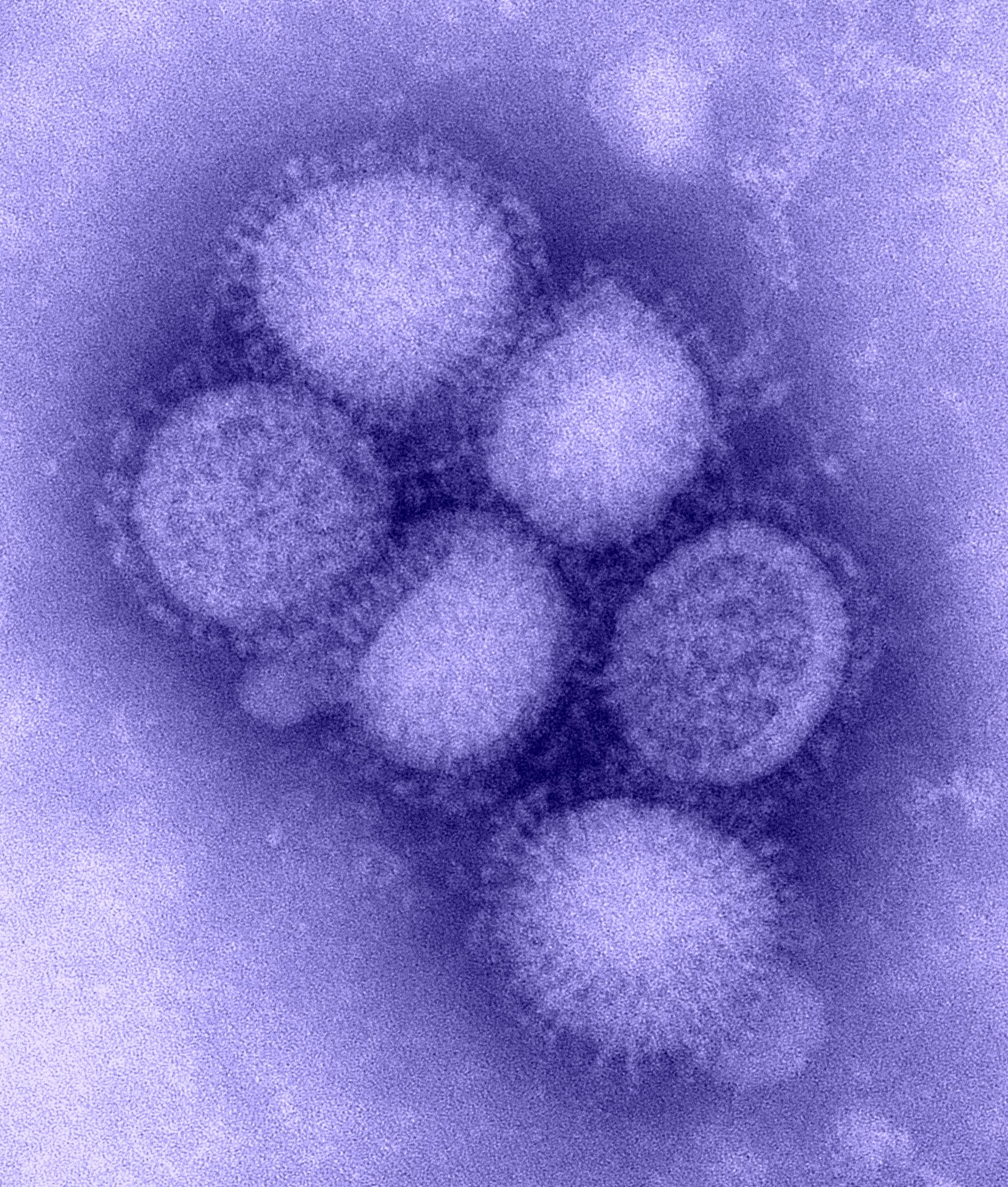

Virus classification
- (unranked): Virus
- Realm: Riboviria
- Kingdom: Orthornavirae
- Phylum: Negarnaviricota
- Class: Insthoviricetes
- Order: Articulavirales
- Family: Orthomyxoviridae
- Genus: Alphainfluenzavirus
- Species: Influenza A virus
- Serotype: Influenza A virus subtype H1N1

Strains
- Pandemic H1N1/09 virus

= Influenza A virus subtype H1N1 =

Subtype of Influenza A virus

Influenza A virus subtype H1N1 (A/H1N1) is a subtype of influenza A virus (IAV). Some human-adapted strains of H1N1 are endemic in humans and are one cause of seasonal influenza (flu). Other strains of H1N1 are endemic in pigs (swine influenza) and in birds (avian influenza). Subtypes of IAV are defined by the combination of the antigenic hemagglutinin (H) and neuraminidase (N) proteins in the viral envelope; for example, "H1N1" designates an IAV subtype that has a type-1 H protein and a type-1 N protein.

All subtypes of IAV share a negative-sense, segmented RNA genome. Under rare circumstances, one strain of the virus can acquire genetic material through genetic reassortment from a different strain and thus evolve to acquire new characteristics, enabling it to evade host immunity and occasionally to jump from one species of host to another. Major outbreaks of H1N1 strains in humans include the 1918 Spanish flu pandemic, the 1977 Russian flu pandemic and the 2009 swine flu pandemic, all of which were caused by strains of A(H1N1) virus which are believed to have undergone genetic reassortment.

Each year, three influenza strains are chosen for inclusion in the forthcoming year's seasonal flu vaccination by the Global Influenza Surveillance and Response System of the World Health Organization (WHO). Since 1999, every annual formulation has included one strain of A/H1N1 as well as two other influenza strains – together representing strains thought most likely to cause significant human suffering in the coming season.

== Swine influenza ==
Swine influenza (also known as swine flu or pig flu) is a respiratory disease that occurs in pigs that is caused by the Influenza A virus. Influenza viruses that are normally found in swine are known as swine influenza viruses (SIVs). The three main subtypes of SIV that circulate globally are A(H1N1), A(H1N2), and A(H3N2). These subtypes are well adapted to pigs and are different from human influenza viruses of the same subtype.

Swine influenza virus is common throughout pig populations worldwide. Transmission of the virus from pigs to humans is not common and does not always lead to human influenza, often resulting only in the production of antibodies in the blood. If transmission does cause human influenza, it is called zoonotic swine flu or a variant virus. People with regular exposure to pigs are at increased risk of swine flu infection. Properly cooking the meat of an infected animal removes the risk of infection.

Pigs experimentally infected with the strain of swine flu that caused the human pandemic of 2009–10 showed clinical signs of flu within four days, and the virus spread to other uninfected pigs housed with the infected ones.

== Incidents ==
=== 1918–1920 flu pandemic ===
The 1918 flu was an unusually severe and deadly strain of H1N1 avian influenza, which killed from 17 to 50 or more million people worldwide over about a year in 1918 and 1920. It was one of the deadliest pandemics in human history.

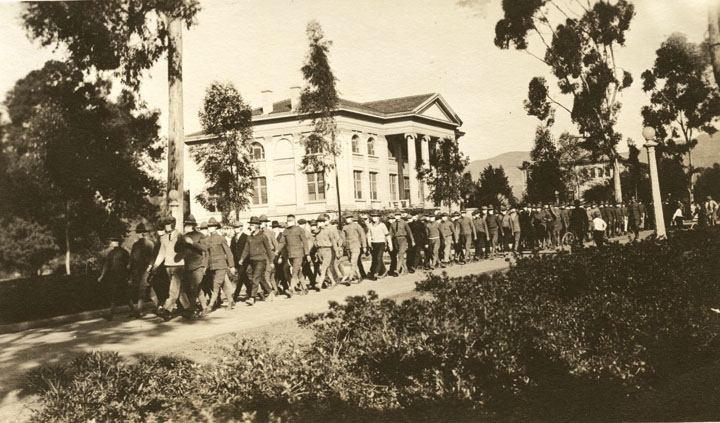
Soldiers march in front of the Pomona College Carnegie Library during the Spanish flu pandemic in 1918, all garbed in uniforms and face masks.

The 1918 flu caused an abnormally high number of deaths, possibly due to it provoking a cytokine storm in the body. (The H5N1 bird flu, also an Influenza A virus, has a similar effect.) After the 1918 flu infected lung cells, it frequently led to overstimulation of the immune system via release of immune response-stimulating cytokines (proteins that transmit signals between cells) into the lung tissue. This leads to extensive leukocyte migration towards the lungs, resulting in the destruction of lung cells and secretion of blood and mucus into the alveoli and airways. This makes it difficult for the patient to breathe and can result in suffocation. In contrast to other pandemics, which mostly kill the old and the very young, the 1918 pandemic killed unusual numbers of young adults, which may have been due to their healthy immune systems mounting a too-strong and damaging response to the infection.

The term "Spanish" flu was coined because Spain was at the time the only European country where the press were printing reports of the outbreak, which had killed thousands in the armies fighting World War I (1914–1918). Other countries suppressed the news in order to protect morale.

=== 1976 swine flu outbreak ===
In 1976, a novel swine influenza A (H1N1) caused severe respiratory illness in 13 soldiers, with one death at Fort Dix, New Jersey. The virus was detected only from 19 January to 9 February and did not spread beyond Fort Dix. Retrospective serologic testing subsequently demonstrated that up to 230 soldiers had been infected with the novel virus, which was an H1N1 strain. The cause of the outbreak is still unknown, and no exposure to pigs was identified.

=== 1977 Russian flu ===
The 1977 Russian flu pandemic was caused by strain Influenza A/USSR/90/77 (H1N1). It infected mostly children and young adults under 23; because a similar strain was prevalent in 1947–57, most adults had substantial immunity. Later analysis found that the re-emergent strain had been circulating for approximately one year before it was detected in China and Russia. The virus was included in the 1978–79 influenza vaccine.

=== 2009 A(H1N1) pandemic ===
Illustration of influenza antigenic shift

In the 2009 flu pandemic, the virus isolated from patients in the United States was found to be made up of genetic elements from four different flu viruses – North American swine influenza, North American avian influenza, human influenza, and swine influenza virus typically found in Asia and Europe – "an unusually mongrelised mix of genetic sequences." This new strain appears to be a result of reassortment of human influenza and swine influenza viruses, in all four different strains of subtype H1N1.

Preliminary genetic characterization found that the hemagglutinin (HA) gene was similar to that of swine flu viruses present in U.S. pigs since 1999, but the neuraminidase (NA) and matrix protein (M) genes resembled versions present in European swine flu isolates. The six genes from American swine flu are themselves mixtures of swine flu, bird flu, and human flu viruses. While viruses with this genetic makeup had not previously been found to be circulating in humans or pigs, there is no formal national surveillance system to determine what viruses are circulating in pigs in the U.S.

In April 2009, an outbreak of influenza-like illness (ILI) occurred in Mexico and then in the United States; the CDC reported seven cases of novel A/H1N1 influenza and promptly shared the genetic sequences on the GISAID database. With similar timely sharing of data for Mexican isolates, by 24 April it became clear that the outbreak of ILI in Mexico and the confirmed cases of novel influenza A in the southwest US were related and WHO issued a health advisory on the outbreak of "influenza-like illness in the United States and Mexico". The disease then spread very rapidly, with the number of confirmed cases rising to 2,099 by 7 May, despite aggressive measures taken by the Mexican government to curb the spread of the disease. The outbreak had been predicted a year earlier by noticing the increasing number of replikins, a type of peptide, found in the virus.

On 11 June 2009, the WHO declared an H1N1 pandemic, moving the alert level to phase 6, marking the first global pandemic since the 1968 Hong Kong flu. On 25 October 2009, U.S. President Barack Obama officially declared H1N1 a national emergency. The President's declaration caused many U.S. employers to take actions to help stem the spread of the swine flu and to accommodate employees and / or workflow which may have been impacted by an outbreak.

A study conducted in coordination with the University of Michigan Health Service – scheduled for publication in the December 2009 American Journal of Roentgenology – warned that H1N1 flu can cause pulmonary embolism, surmised as a leading cause of death in this pandemic. The study authors suggest physician evaluation via contrast enhanced CT scans for the presence of pulmonary emboli when caring for patients diagnosed with respiratory complications from a "severe" case of the H1N1 flu. H1N1 may induce other embolic events, such as myocardial infarction, bilateral massive DVT, arterial thrombus of infrarenal aorta, thrombosis of right external iliac vein and common femoral vein or cerebral gas embolism. The type of embolic events caused by H1N1 infection are summarized in a 2010 review by Dimitroulis Ioannis et al.

The 21 March 2010 worldwide update, by the U.N.'s World Health Organization (WHO), states that "213 countries and overseas territories/communities have reported laboratory confirmed cases of pandemic influenza H1N1 2009, including at least 16,931 deaths." As of 30 May 2010, worldwide update by World Health Organization (WHO) more than 214 countries and overseas territories or communities have reported laboratory confirmed cases of pandemic influenza H1N1 2009, including over 18,138 deaths. The research team of Andrew Miller showed pregnant patients are at increased risk. It has been suggested that pregnant women and certain populations such as native North Americans have a greater likelihood of developing a T helper type 2 response to H1N1 influenza which may be responsible for the systemic inflammatory response syndrome that causes pulmonary edema and death.

On 26 April 2011, an H1N1 pandemic preparedness alert was issued by the World Health Organization for the Americas. In August 2011, according to the U.S. Geological Survey and the CDC, northern sea otters off the coast of Washington state were infected with the same version of the H1N1 flu virus that caused the 2009 pandemic and "may be a newly identified animal host of influenza viruses". In May 2013, seventeen people died during an H1N1 outbreak in Venezuela, and a further 250 were infected. As of early January 2014, Texas health officials have confirmed at least thirty-three H1N1 deaths and widespread outbreak during the 2013/2014 flu season, while twenty-one more deaths have been reported across the US. Nine people have been reported dead from an outbreak in several Canadian cities, and Mexico reports outbreaks resulting in at least one death. Spanish health authorities have confirmed 35 H1N1 cases in the Aragon region, 18 of whom are in intensive care. On 17 March 2014, three cases were confirmed with a possible fourth awaiting results occurring at the Centre for Addiction and Mental Health in Toronto, Ontario, Canada.

=== 2012 India outbreak ===
With more than 300 infections and over 20 deaths, India's health ministry declared an outbreak "well under control" with "no reason to panic" in April 2012.

=== 2015 India outbreak ===
According to the Indian Health Ministry, 31,974 cases of swine flu had been reported and 1,895 people had died from an outbreak by mid-March.

=== 2017 Maldives outbreak ===
Maldives reported swine flu in early 2017; 501 people were tested for the disease and 185 (37%) of those tested were positive for the disease. Four of those who tested positive from these 185 died due to this disease.

The total number of people who have died due to the disease is unknown. Patient Zero was never identified.

Schools were closed for a week due to the disease, but were ordered by the Ministry of Education to open after the holidays even though the disease was not fully under control.

=== 2017 Myanmar outbreak ===
Myanmar reported H1N1 in late July 2017. As of 27 July, there were 30 confirmed cases and six people had died. The Ministry of Health and Sports of Myanmar sent an official request to WHO to provide help to control the virus; and also mentioned that the government would be seeking international assistance, including from the UN, China and the United States.

=== 2017–18 Pakistan outbreak ===
Pakistan reported H1N1 cases mostly arising from the city of Multan, with deaths resulting from the epidemic reaching 42. There have also been confirmed cases in cities of Gujranwala and Lahore.

=== 2019 Malta outbreak ===
An outbreak of swine flu in the European Union member state was reported in mid-January 2019, with the island's main state hospital overcrowded within a week, with more than 30 cases being treated.

=== 2019 Morocco outbreak ===
In January 2019 an outbreak of H1N1 was recorded in Morocco, with nine confirmed fatalities.

=== 2019 Iran outbreak ===
In November 2019 an outbreak of H1N1 was recorded in Iran, with 56 fatalities and 4,000 people hospitalized.

=== G4 virus ===
The G4 virus, also known as the "G4 swine flu virus" (G4) and "G4 EA H1N1", is a swine influenza virus strain discovered in China. The virus is a variant genotype 4 (G4) Eurasian avian-like (EA) H1N1 virus that mainly affects pigs, but there is some evidence of it infecting people. A 2020 peer-reviewed paper from the Proceedings of the National Academy of Sciences (PNAS) stated that "G4 EA H1N1 viruses possess all the essential hallmarks of being highly adapted to infect humans ... Controlling the prevailing G4 EA H1N1 viruses in pigs and close monitoring of swine working populations should be promptly implemented."

Michael Ryan, executive director of the World Health Organization (WHO) Health Emergencies Program, stated in July 2020 that this strain of influenza virus was not new and had been under surveillance since 2011. The Chinese CDC said it had implemented an influenza surveillance program in 2010, analyzing more than 400,000 tests annually, to facilitate early identification of influenza. Of those, 13 A(H1N1) cases were detected, of which three were of the G4 variant.

The study stated that almost 30,000 swine had been monitored via nasal swabs between 2011 and 2018. While other variants of the virus have appeared and diminished, the study claimed the G4 variant had sharply increased since 2016 to become the predominant strain. The Chinese Ministry of Agriculture and Rural Affairs rebutted the study, saying that the number of pigs sampled was too small to demonstrate G4 had become the dominant strain and that the media had interpreted the study "in an exaggerated and nonfactual way". They also said the infected workers "did not show flu symptoms and the test sample is not representative of the pig population in China".

The US Centers for Disease Control and Prevention (CDC) said the study suggested that human infection by the G4 virus is more common than it was thought to be. Both the European Centre for Disease Prevention and Control (ECDC) and the US CDC stated that, like all flu viruses with pandemic potential, the variant is a concern that will be monitored. The ECDC stated that "the most important intervention in preparing for the pandemic potential of influenza viruses is the development and use of human vaccines ...". Health officials (including Anthony Fauci) have said that the virus should be monitored, particularly among those in close contact with pigs, but it is not an immediate threat. While there have been no reported cases or evidence of the virus outside China as of July 2020, Smithsonian Magazine reported in July 2020 that scientists agree that the virus should be closely monitored, but because it "so far cannot jump from person to person", it should not be a cause for alarm yet.

== Infection in pregnancy ==
Pregnant women who contract the H1N1 infection are at greater risk of developing complications because of hormonal changes, physical changes and changes to their immune system to accommodate the growing fetus. For this reason the Centers for Disease Control and Prevention recommends that those who are pregnant be vaccinated to prevent the influenza virus. The vaccination should not be taken by people who have had a severe allergic reaction to the influenza vaccination. Those who are moderately to severely ill, with or without a fever should wait until they recover before vaccination.

== Antiviral treatment ==
Pregnant women who become infected with the influenza are advised to contact their doctor immediately. Influenza can be treated with prescription antiviral medications. Oseltamivir (trade name Tamiflu) and zanamivir (Relenza) are two neuraminidase inhibitors (antiviral medications) recommended. They are most effective when taken within two days of becoming sick.

Since 1 October 2008, the CDC has tested 1,146 seasonal influenza A (H1N1) viruses for resistance against oseltamivir and zanamivir. It was found that 99.6% of the samples were resistant to oseltamivir while none were resistant to zanamivir. After 2009 Influenza A (H1N1) virus samples were tested, only 4% (of 853 samples) showed resistance to oseltamivir (again, no samples showed resistance to zanamivir). A study conducted in Japan during the 2009 H1N1 pandemic concluded that infants exposed to either oseltamivir or zanamivir had no short term adverse effects. Both amantadine and rimantadine have been found to be teratogenic and embryotoxic (malformations and toxic effects on the embryo) when given at high doses in animal studies.
