= Influenza A virus subtype H7N2 =

Virus classification
- (unranked): Virus
- Realm: Riboviria
- Kingdom: Orthornavirae
- Phylum: Negarnaviricota
- Class: Insthoviricetes
- Order: Articulavirales
- Family: Orthomyxoviridae
- Genus: Alphainfluenzavirus
- Species: Influenza A virus
- Serotype: Influenza A virus subtype H7N2

Virus subtype

Influenza A virus subtype H7N2 (A/H7N2) is a subtype of the species Influenza A virus. This subtype is one of several sometimes called bird flu virus. H7N2 is considered a low pathogenicity avian influenza (LPAI) virus. With this in mind, H5 & H7 influenza viruses can re-assort into the Highly Pathogenic variant if conditions are favorable.

A CDC study following outbreaks of H7N2 in commercial poultry farms in western Virginia in 2002 concluded:

An important factor contributing to rapid early spread of AI virus infection among commercial poultry farms during this outbreak was disposal of dead birds via rendering off-farm. Because of the highly infectious nature of AI virus and the devastating economic impact of outbreaks, poultry farmers should consider carcass disposal techniques that do not require off-farm movement, such as burial, composting, or incineration.

One person in Virginia, United States in 2002, one person in New York, United States, in 2003, and one person in New York, United States, in 2016 were found to have serologic evidence of infection from H7N2; all fully recovered.

An analysis of the New York 2003 case concluded that the H7N2 virus responsible could be evolving toward the same strong sugar-binding properties of the three worldwide viral pandemics in 1918, 1957 and 1968. (Human flus and bird flus differ in the molecules they are good at binding with because mammals and birds differ in the molecules on the cell surface to be bound with. Humans have very few cells with the bird sugar on its cell surface.) A study with ferrets showed that this H7N2 strain could be passed from mammal to mammal.

In February 2004, an outbreak of low pathogenic avian influenza (LPAI) A (H7N2) was reported on 2 chicken farms in Delaware and in four live bird markets in New Jersey supplied by the same farms. In March 2004, surveillance samples from a flock of chickens in Maryland tested positive for LPAI H7N2. It is likely that this was the same strain.

In the aftermath of the 2004 outbreak in the Delmarva Peninsula, a new method of mass killing farm animals was developed called foam depopulation. The method is a controversial and works by spraying foam over a large area to obstruct breathing and cause suffocation.

On 24 May 2007, an outbreak of H7N2 was confirmed at a poultry farm near Corwen, in Wales from tests on chickens that died from H7N2. The owners of the Conwy farm bought 15 Rhode Island Red chickens two weeks prior but all died from H7N2. The 32 other poultry at the site were slaughtered. A one kilometer exclusion zone was put in force around the property in which birds and bird products cannot be moved and bird gathering can only take place under licence. Nine people who were associated with the infected or dead poultry and reported flu-like symptoms were tested. Four tested positive for evidence of infection from H7N2 and were successfully treated for mild flu. In early June it was discovered that the virus had spread to a poultry farm 70 miles (113 km) away near St. Helens in north-west England. All the poultry at the farm were slaughtered and a 1 km exclusion zone imposed.

In December 2016, an outbreak of low pathogenic avian influenza H7N2 occurred in a feline population in the New York City Animal Care Center (ACC) shelters after testing by the University of Wisconsin-Madison School of Veterinary Medicine and confirmed by USDA's National Veterinary Diagnostic Services Laboratory. Over 100 cats were found to be infected and subsequently quarantined, but only one human, a veterinarian involved in obtaining respiratory specimens, was found to be infected. The veterinarian had a brief illness with mild symptoms and recovered completely. All other humans exposed to the infected cats tested negative.
