= Foam depopulation =

Method of mass killing farm animals via foam

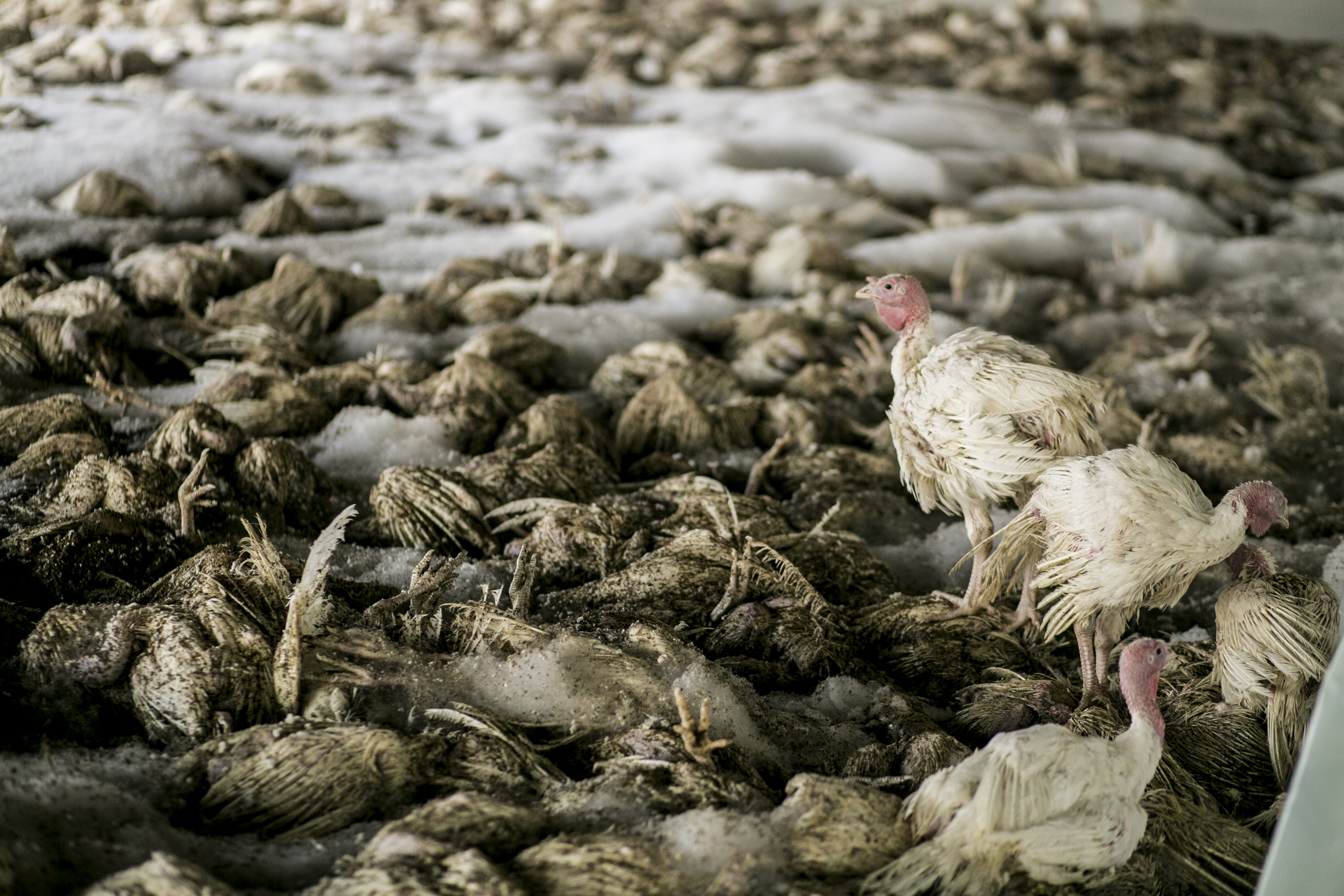
Aftermath of foam depopulation being used on a flock of turkeys with a few still alive, as often occurs

Foam depopulation or foaming is a means of mass-killing farm animals by spraying foam over a large area to obstruct breathing and ultimately cause suffocation. It is usually used to attempt to stop disease spread. Foaming has also been used to kill farm animals after backlogs in slaughtering occurred during the COVID-19 pandemic. Foam depopulation has been used on poultry and pigs and has seen initial research for use on cattle. It has faced criticism from some groups. Some veterinarians have called it inhumane, along with many animal rights and animal welfare organizations who cite the pain caused by suffocation or the harm experienced by the stray survivors.

== History ==
Foam depopulation was developed in 2006 in response to a 2004 outbreak of H7N2. It received conditional approval the same year in the US by the USDA-APHIS.

In the 2015 H5N2 outbreak in the US, foaming was the primary method used to kill poultry en masse with it employed at 66% of locations. However, since 2019, foaming has increasingly been replaced in the US with ventilation shutdown, a controversial method which relies on suffocation and heatstroke after shutting off airways into a building.

In 2020, the COVID-19 pandemic caused supply chain disruption and meat packing closures. This led to a backlog in slaughtering—leading to many locations using foaming or ventilation shutdown to mass-kill farm animals outside of the typical slaughtering process.

In late 2023, Cooks Venture ran out of money and asked the Arkansas Department of Agriculture to foam ~1.3 million chickens. The stated reason was for bird flu. However, contract farmers say their birds were killed even when they did not test positive for bird flu and still had resources to keep them alive.

== Criticism ==
Foam depopulation has been called inhumane by organizations such as the ASPCA, Animal Justice, and Mercy For Animals, among others. Some veterinarians have also questioned the ethics of the method. Concerns include the pain felt during suffocation and the stress or other effects on stray survivors seeing those who have died around them.

Other groups, such as the Center for Biological Diversity, have raised issues about the usage of PFAS from farms using firefighting foam to accomplish foam depopulation.

Additionally, some researchers have raised environmental concerns about water-based foam's resource usage. Amounts vary, but using 30,000 liters of water to produce foam is typical. Water is usually the majority of the foam with foam concentrate making up 1% of it.

== Global usage ==
While first developed in the United States, foaming has seen use elsewhere. For instance, usage is common in Israel and Australia.

Some countries' governing bodies have also given support more directly to foam depopulation. For instance, the Japanese Ministry of Agriculture, Forestry and Fisheries has purchased equipment for foaming that can be issued out. The United States National Veterinary Stockpile maintains foam depopulation units as well.

== See also ==
- Avian influenza
- Feedback (pork industry)
- Thumping
