= 2015 United States H5N2 outbreak =

2015 outbreak of avian influenza subtype H5N2

In 2015, an outbreak of avian influenza subtype H5N2 was identified in a series of chicken and turkey farming operations in the Midwestern United States. By May 30, more than 43 million birds in 15 states had been destroyed as a result of the outbreak, including nearly 30 million in Iowa alone, the nation's largest egg producer. In the Midwestern U.S., the average price of eggs had increased 120% between April 22 and May 30. The effects however were seen nationwide, with prices in California up 71% in the same timeframe.

The virus was first identified in Minnesota in early March. Prior to April 20, it affected commercial turkey farms almost exclusively, in the states of Arkansas, Iowa, Missouri, North Dakota, South Dakota, Wisconsin, and at 28 farms in Minnesota, where the virus was initially identified. Migratory waterfowl are assumed to have brought the disease to the Midwest, but how it made its way into poultry barns is undetermined.

== Spread to hen farms ==
On Monday, April 20, the U.S. Department of Agriculture announced that 5.3 million egg-producing hens at a northwest Iowa farm must be destroyed after the virus was confirmed. The number at this operation alone comprised a little over 1% of egg-laying hens in the United States.

As of May 27, over 25 million chickens had either died of the infection or been euthanized in Iowa alone. Nebraska's toll at the same date was 7 million—a majority of the state's 9.45 million egg-laying hens.

=== Table of infections ===
A map of all poultry killed by the 2015 H5N2 virus or culled to contain the outbreak.

This table shows large bird farm infections during the 2015 outbreak. All birds affected either died of the H5N2 infection itself, or were destroyed as a precautionary measure. While 205 total infections were confirmed through June 1, only larger outbreaks (affecting >200,000 hens or >50,000 turkeys) are displayed here.

Date detected	Location	Birds affected	Type	Source
March 27	Lac qui Parle County, Minnesota	66,000	Turkeys	
April 1	Beadle County, South Dakota	50,600	Turkeys	
April 2	Stearns County, Minnesota	71,000	Turkeys	
April 4	Stearns County, Minnesota	76,000	Turkeys	
April 7	Meeker County, Minnesota	310,000	Turkeys	
April 8	Kingsbury County, South Dakota	71,900	Turkeys	
April 9	Lyon County, Minnesota	66,000	Turkeys	
April 10	McPherson County, South Dakota	55,200	Turkeys	
April 10	McCook County, South Dakota	54,700	Turkeys	
April 11	Jefferson County, Wisconsin	189,100	Chickens	
April 13	Swift County, Minnesota	160,000	Turkeys	
April 13	Stearns County, Minnesota	76,000	Turkeys	
April 14	Swift County, Minnesota	154,000	Turkeys	
April 14	Redwood County, Minnesota	56,000	Turkeys	
April 15	Kandiyohi County, Minnesota	152,000	Turkeys	
April 15	Stearns County, Minnesota	67,000	Turkeys	
April 15	Roberts County, South Dakota	66,600	Turkeys	
April 16	Barron County, Wisconsin	126,700	Turkeys	
April 20	Osceola County, Iowa	3,800,000 (Note: Initially reported as 5.3 million birds; APHIS confirmation count was adjusted.)	Chickens	
April 20	Wadena County, Minnesota	301,000	Turkeys	
April 20	Kandiyohi County, Minnesota	61,000	Turkeys	
April 21	Kandiyohi County, Minnesota	130,400	Turkeys	
April 21	Kandiyohi County, Minnesota	61,000	Turkeys	
April 21	Stearns County, Minnesota	53,900	Turkeys	
April 22	Stearns County, Minnesota	72,500	Turkeys	
April 22	Kandiyohi County, Minnesota	62,600	Turkeys	
April 22	Kandiyohi County, Minnesota	62,600	Turkeys	
April 22	Meeker County, Minnesota	58,900	Turkeys	
April 23	Clay County, Minnesota	408,500	Chickens	
April 23	Chippewa County, Wisconsin	56,500	Turkeys	
April 23	Kandiyohi County, Minnesota	54,300	Turkeys	
April 24	Jefferson County, Wisconsin	1,031,000	Chickens	
April 24	LaMoure County, North Dakota	71,500	Mixed poultry	
April 24	Kandiyohi County, Minnesota	67,000	Turkeys	
April 24	Chippewa County, Minnesota	64,900	Turkeys	
April 27	Sioux County, Iowa	1,603,900	Chickens	
April 27	Barron County, Wisconsin	83,300	Turkeys	
April 28	Sioux County, Iowa	3,660,000	Chickens	
April 28	Osceola County, Iowa	258,000	Chickens	
April 28	Steele County, Minnesota	82,900	Turkeys	
April 28	Kandiyohi County, Minnesota	50,900	Turkeys	
April 29	Stearns County, Minnesota	202,500	Chickens	
April 30	Buena Vista County, Iowa	449,100	Turkeys	
April 30	Barron County, Minnesota	96,500	Turkeys	
May 1	Buena Vista County, Iowa	4,910,600	Chickens	
May 4	Madison County, Iowa	1,495,600	Chickens	
May 5	Wright County, Iowa	2,821,800	Chickens	
May 5	Nicollet County, Minnesota	1,102,900	Chickens	
May 5	Barron County, Wisconsin	182,400	Turkeys	
May 5	Swift County, Minnesota	151,300	Turkeys	
May 5	Kandiyohi County, Minnesota	89,100	Turkeys	
May 5	Pipestone County, Minnesota	72,200	Turkeys	
May 5	Barron County, Wisconsin	57,200	Turkeys	
May 6	Kandiyohi County, Minnesota	65,000	Turkeys	
May 7	Sioux County, Iowa	309,900	Chickens	
May 7	Osceola County, Iowa	256,000	Chickens	
May 7	Buena Vista County, Iowa	52,900	Turkeys	
May 8	Wright County, Iowa	1,106,500	Chickens	
May 8	Sioux County, Iowa	581,300	Chickens	
May 8	Sioux County, Iowa	327,900	Chickens	
May 8	Sioux County, Iowa	303,100	Chickens	
May 11	Swift County, Minnesota	65,600	Turkeys	
May 12	Dixon County, Nebraska	1,791,500	Chickens	
May 12	Wright County, Iowa	966,600	Chickens	
May 13	Hutchinson County, South Dakota	70,600	Turkeys	
May 13	Yankton County, South Dakota	70,600	Turkeys	
May 14	Lyon County, Iowa	390,000	Chickens	
May 15	Dixon County, Nebraska	1,709,400	Chickens	
May 15	Buena Vista County, Iowa	903,700	Chickens	
May 15	Sioux County, Iowa	272,300	Chickens	
May 15	Sioux County, Iowa	240,000	Chickens	
May 18	Moody County, South Dakota	642,700 (Note: Originally reported as 1.3 million birds; APHIS confirmation count was adjusted.)	Chickens	
May 18	Meeker County, Minnesota	138,800	Turkeys	
May 19	Renville County, Minnesota	2,045,600	Chickens	
May 20	Sioux County, Iowa	240,000	Chickens	
May 21	Sac County, Iowa	100,000	Turkeys	
May 26	Dixon County, Nebraska	293,200 (Note: Originally reported as 500,000 birds; APHIS confirmation count was adjusted.)	Chickens	
May 27	Knox County, Nebraska	3,000,000	Chickens	
May 27	Adair County, Iowa	974,500	Chickens	
May 27	Renville County, Minnesota	95,300	Turkeys	
May 28	Wright County, Iowa	991,500	Chickens	
May 28	Kandiyohi County, Minnesota	50,800	Turkeys	
June 1	Wright County, Iowa	434,800	Chickens	
June 1	Moody County, South Dakota	52,000	Turkeys	

== Control ==
When an infection was confirmed, all birds at the affected farm were destroyed per USDA guidelines. The birds were often culled by foam depopulation through pumping an expanding water-based foam into the barn houses, which suffocates them within minutes. The birds were then composted, usually at the location.
