= Robert Webster (virologist) =

Virologist

Robert Gordon Webster
- Born: 5 July 1932 (age 94); Balclutha, New Zealand
- Education: University of Otago; Australian National University
- Scientific career
- Fields: Virology
- Workplaces: St. Jude Children's Research Hospital

Robert Gordon Webster (b. 1932) is an avian influenza authority who correctly posited that pandemic strains of flu arise from genes in flu virus strains in nonhumans; for example, via a reassortment of genetic segments (antigenic shift) between viruses in humans and nonhumans (especially birds) rather than by mutations (antigenic drift) in annual human flu strains.

== Background ==
Robert Webster was born on 5 July 1932 in Balclutha, New Zealand, and grew up on a farm. He studied microbiology on leaving school, gaining his BSc from University of Otago, New Zealand in 1955, his MSc at the same university in 1957, and his PhD from the Australian National University, Canberra, Australia, in 1962.

He worked as a virologist with the New Zealand Department of Agriculture in 1958 - 1959 before being appointed research fellow at the Department of Microbiology at ANU's John Curtin Medical School, for 1964 - 1966. He moved to U.S. in 1969 where he became a member of both the Department of Microbiology and the Department of Immunology at the St. Jude Children's Research Hospital in Memphis, Tennessee, a city where he has lived ever since and has held many research posts.

== Accomplishments ==
Webster holds the Rose Marie Thomas Chair in Virology at St. Jude Children's Research Hospital. He is also director of the World Health Organization Collaborating Center on the Ecology of Influenza Viruses in Lower Animals and Birds, the world's only laboratory designed to study influenza at the animal-human interface. He is a Fellow of the Royal Society of London, the Royal Society of Medicine and the Royal Society of New Zealand, and a member of the National Academy of Sciences of the United States. In December 2002, he was presented with the Bristol-Myers Squibb Award for Distinguished Achievement in Infectious Diseases Research.

Webster has been awarded membership of the National Academy of Sciences of the United States of America, and has been named a fellow of the Royal Society Te Apārangi and the Royal Society of London. He is also a member of the American Society for Microbiology, American Society for Virology, and the American Association for the Advancement of Science, and is a fellow of the Royal Society of Medicine. He heads the World Health Organization (WHO) collaborating laboratory on animal influenza.

== Work on general influenza ==
Webster's major discoveries relating to influenza include the likelihood that avians were most likely the culprit in other flu outbreaks. His work is also responsible for the method of human influenza vaccination that is commonly used. Before Webster and his colleagues separated the influenza virus into different particles, the entire influenza virus was injected into a patient as a vaccine - now, only certain parts of the virus are used to create the same response, lessening side effects of the vaccine.

== H5N1 Work ==
Webster's work with the avian flu began after a beach walk with fellow researcher Graeme Laver, on which the men noticed a large number of dead birds along the shoreline. Webster wondered whether it was possible that the birds had died from the avian flu, and subsequently traveled to an island to take samples from hundreds of birds. This led to more trips, and eventually Webster discovered a link between the avian flu and the human flu. He deduced that it is possible for the avian and human viruses to combine, creating a new virus that humans would have no antibodies to. In an interview with NBC, he said that when he first proposed this link, few paid attention to what he saw as a great danger. However, Webster theorizes that the only event that has to occur to begin a flu pandemic is the mixing of avian and human flu strains in the same mammalian cell - most likely in a pig. Pigs are similar enough in genetic makeup to humans that they are susceptible to the human flu; also, in many areas, pigs come in close contact with chickens or ducks, making it likely that they will catch the avian flu.

Another danger that Webster has uncovered is the duck. Ducks, while capable of catching and transmitting the avian flu virus through contact with chickens, seldom sicken and die from the exposure. Being alive and quite healthy, the ducks are then capable of spreading the virus to other areas.

== Honors and awards ==
- 1989 Fellow of the Royal Society
- 2010 Royal Society Leeuwenhoek Lecture Prize
