= 2006 H5N1 outbreak in India =

An outbreak of the H5N1 virus in India in 2006 negatively affected the people living in the area, as the poultry industry was their main source of income at the time. Soon after many birds were reported dead in the village of Navapur, in the Nandurbar district of Maharashtra, the government intervened, first confirming the presence of the bird flu and then destroying numerous birds to control the spread of the virus. Residents felt the government overreacted, believing the government had wrongly attributed the reason for the bird deaths; had unnecessarily disrupted their main source of income; and did not compensate them properly for the government's destruction of the birds. Residents also believed that the media caused unnecessary panic over the incident. The government denied any over-reaction to the flu outbreak and stated that they had enough Tamiflu vaccine to protect the Indian population.

== Initial reaction ==
The first reports of bird flu in India came from the village of Navapur in the Nandurbar district of Maharashtra on 19 February 2006. Villagers reported many bird deaths in the village. Maharashtra State Animal Husbandry Ministry authorities rushed to the spot. Lab analysis proved that the poultry was indeed affected with the H5N1 virus.

== Government response ==
Soon after the presence of the virus was confirmed culling operations began. 253,000 birds and 587,000 eggs were destroyed within five days. Villagers who were exhibiting flu-like symptoms were quarantined and kept under observation. Blood samples from 150 persons were sent to the National Institute of Virology, Pune, for analysis. Movement of people into the area was strictly regulated and passenger trains were instructed not to halt at Navapur. Governments of states which border Maharashtra banned the import of poultry from the latter. Some other state governments such as those of Tamil Nadu and Jammu and Kashmir also introduced similar restrictions. The government of India asked pharmaceutical companies such as Cipla to manufacture anti-flu medication. The Government also started stockpiling Tamiflu. The Indian Army was set on alert to aid in evacuation operations and drug-distribution measures.

== Grievances of locals ==
The poultry industry is the main source of income for the people of Nawapur who claimed the Government is overreacting. According to them, the cause of the bird deaths was in fact the seasonal Ranikhet disease and not bird-flu. They alleged that the compensation guaranteed to them by the government after culling had not been handed to them. They also said the media created an unnecessary clamour over the incident.

== Economic impact ==
Prices of chicken products across India plummeted resulting in a steep rise in the prices of mutton and fish. The poultry industry was expected to lose hundreds of millions of rupees because of this. Airlines including Air India, Jet Airways, Indian Airlines and Kingfisher Airlines took chicken off their in-flight menus.

== Official response ==
Both the state and central governments denied any overreaction. The centre said it had enough supplies of Tamiflu and that there was no cause for worry.

== See also ==
- 2008 bird flu outbreak in West Bengal
