= Urner Barry =

American business publisher

- Founded: 1858
- Founder: Benjamin Urner, L. Frank Barry
- Country of origin: United States
- Headquarters location: Toms River, New Jersey
- Publication types: Books, newsletters, directories, wall charts, magazines
- Nonfiction topics: food
- Official website: www.urnerbarry.com

Urner Barry (or Urner Barry Publications Inc.) is an American business publisher that provides market information on the food industry to subscribers from print and non-print media.

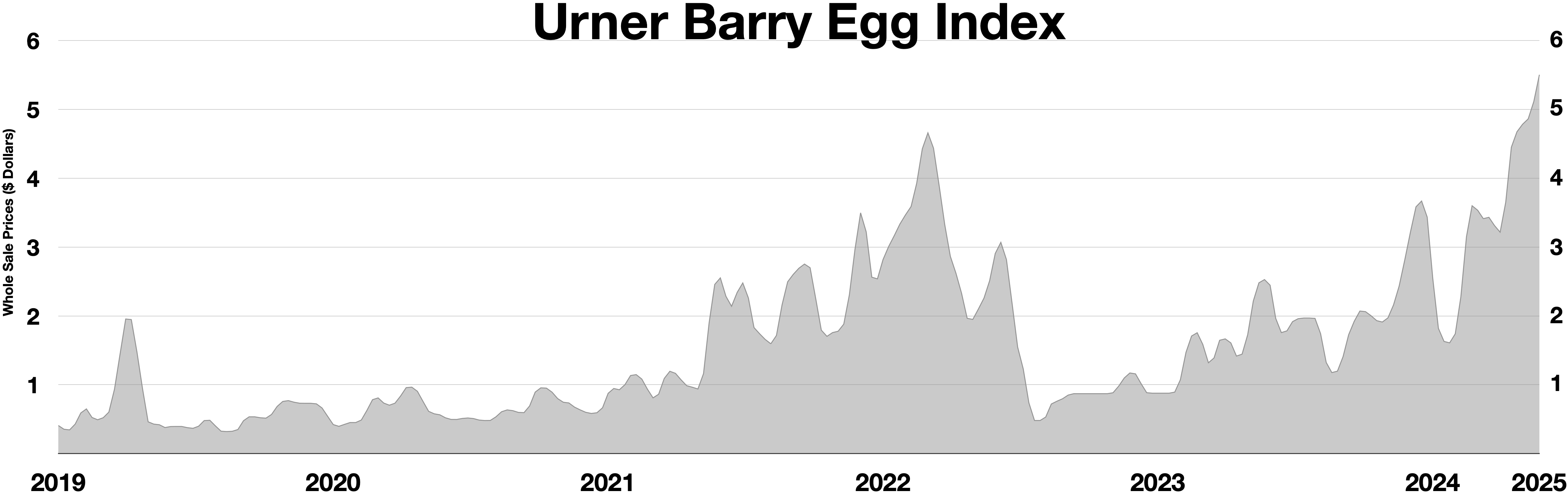
Urner Barry index of egg prices in the United States, 2019–2025

Founded in 1858, Urner Barry focuses today on market information related to red meat, poultry, egg and seafood through its reports and websites. It also administers the sale of ancillary products and services.

== History ==
In 1857, Benjamin Urner was working as a printer in New York City. As a printer, he would encounter many merchants coming to port and requesting price circulars for use at the markets. He began to notice discrepancies in the prices and decided to publish a universal report called the Producers' Price Current, which was later renamed the Urner Barry Price-Current.

The report eventually became a daily circular and the data were collected by visiting with buyers and sellers in New York marketplaces. Urner and his son founded the Urner Publishing Company in 1882, which offered one year subscriptions for $1.00.

In 1873, L. Frank Barry started the New York Daily Market Report, which covered all produce markets. It was the first such daily publication in the country. Since the two were engaged in a similar type of business, they recognized an area of mutual interest and together formed the Urner-Barry Company, which was originally located on 173–175 Chamber Street in New York City.

Urner and Barry were lauded for their expertise in the industry, and even consulted during the publication of L.D.H. Weld's The Marketing of Farm Products In the 1960s, the company moved to Jersey City, New Jersey and later to the Toms River area.

Urner Barry's egg pricing power has been criticized for creating positive feedback loops which increase egg prices above actual market conditions.

== COMTELL ==
COMTELL (short for "Commodity Intelligence") began as a computer platform that transmitted price quotes daily via satellite. It was the company's answer to the growth and progression of their report publishing business, which prior to this had been done by mail.

In the mid-1990s, COMTELL went live as a website. It is used today by industry professionals to access spot and historical quotations for a variety of cuts, as well as market projections, futures quotes, market commentary, news, and analytical tools such as User-Defined Relationships.

== Acquisition of the Yellow Sheet ==
Urner Barry's Price-Current primarily focused on the poultry and egg market, with the Seafood Price-Current being introduced in 1973. In the early 1990s, Urner Barry acquired Yellow Sheet, a Red Meat quotation service similar to the Price-Current, from National Provisioner. This gave Urner Barry the ability to provide protein-focused market information to a variety of businesses.
