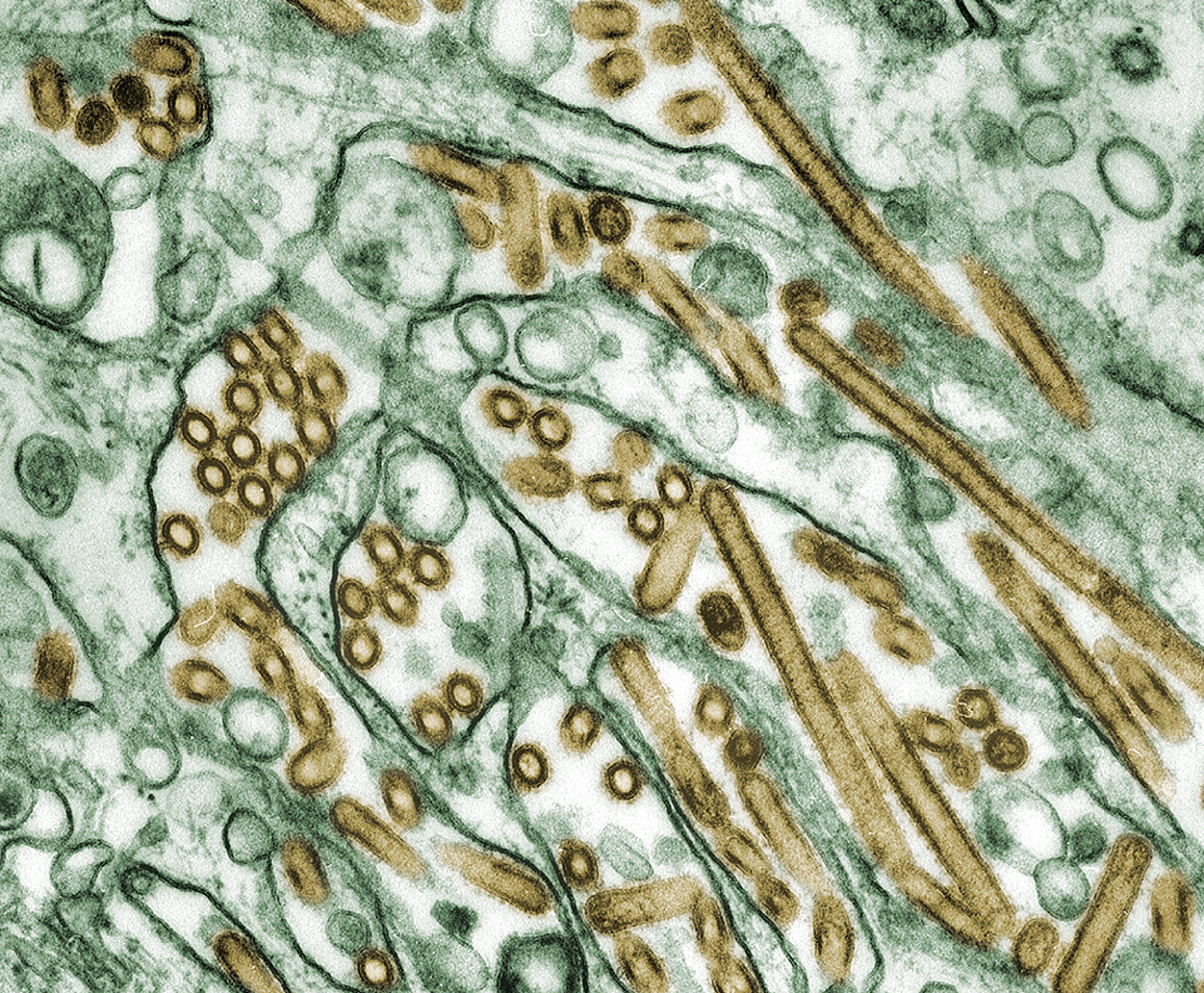
- Colorized transmission electron micrograph of avian influenza A H5N1 viruses (seen in gold) grown in MDCK cells (seen in green)

Virus classification
- (unranked): Virus
- Realm: Riboviria
- Kingdom: Orthornavirae
- Phylum: Negarnaviricota
- Class: Insthoviricetes
- Order: Articulavirales
- Family: Orthomyxoviridae
- Genus: Alphainfluenzavirus
- Species: Influenza A virus

Notable strains
- Goose Guangdong virus; A/Fujian (H5N1)

= Influenza A virus subtype H5N1 =

Influenza A virus

Subtype of influenza A virus

Influenza A virus subtype H5N1 (A/H5N1) is a subtype of the influenza A virus that causes the disease avian influenza (often referred to as "bird flu"). It is enzootic (maintained in the population) in many bird populations, and also panzootic (affecting animals of many species over a wide area). A/H5N1 virus can also infect mammals (including humans) that have been exposed to infected birds; in these cases, symptoms can be severe or fatal.

A/H5N1 virus is shed in the saliva, mucus, and feces of infected birds; other infected animals may shed bird flu viruses in respiratory secretions and other body fluids (such as milk). The virus can spread rapidly through poultry flocks and among wild birds. As of December 2024, an estimated half billion farmed birds have been slaughtered in efforts to contain the virus.

Symptoms of A/H5N1 influenza vary according to both the strain of virus underlying the infection and on the species of bird or mammal affected. Classification as either Low Pathogenic Avian Influenza (LPAI) or High Pathogenic Avian Influenza (HPAI) is based on the severity of symptoms in domestic chickens and does not predict the severity of symptoms in other species. Chickens infected with LPAI A/H5N1 virus display mild symptoms or are asymptomatic, whereas HPAI A/H5N1 causes serious breathing difficulties, a significant drop in egg production, and sudden death.

In mammals, including humans, A/H5N1 influenza (whether LPAI or HPAI) is rare. Symptoms of infection vary from mild to severe, including fever, diarrhea, and cough. Between 2003 and December 2025, the World Health Organization has recorded 993 cases of confirmed H5N1 influenza, leading to 477 deaths. The true fatality rate is presumably lower because cases with mild symptoms may not have been identified as H5N1.

HPAI A/H5N1 influenza virus was first identified in farmed geese in southern China in 1996. Between 1996 and 2018, A/H5N1 coexisted in bird populations with other subtypes of the virus, but since then, the highly pathogenic subtype HPAI A(H5N1) has become the dominant strain in bird populations worldwide. Some strains of A/H5N1 which are highly pathogenic to chickens have adapted to cause mild symptoms in ducks and geese, and are able to spread rapidly through bird migration. Mammals that have been recorded with H5N1 infection include cattle, seals, goats, and skunks.

Due to the high lethality and virulence of HPAI A(H5N1), its worldwide presence, its increasingly diverse host reservoir, and its significant ongoing mutations, the H5N1 virus is regarded as the world's largest pandemic threat. Domestic poultry may potentially be protected from specific strains of the virus by vaccination. In the event of a serious outbreak of H5N1 flu among humans, health agencies have prepared "candidate" vaccines that may be used to prevent infection and control the outbreak; however, it could take several months to ramp up mass production.

== Signs and symptoms ==
Some species of wild aquatic birds act as natural asymptomatic carriers of a large variety of influenza A viruses, which they can spread over large distances in their annual migration. Symptoms of avian influenza vary according to both the strain of virus underlying the infection, and on the species of bird affected. Symptoms of influenza in birds may include swollen head, watery eyes, unresponsiveness, lack of coordination, respiratory distress such as sneezing or gurgling.

=== Humans ===
Avian flu viruses, both HPAI and LPAI, can infect humans who are in close, unprotected contact with infected poultry. Incidents of cross-species transmission are rare, with symptoms ranging in severity from no symptoms or mild illness, to severe disease that resulted in death. As of February 2024 there have been very few instances of human-to-human transmission, and each outbreak has been limited to a few people. All subtypes of avian Influenza A have potential to cross the species barrier, with H5N1 and H7N9 considered the biggest threats. In December 2024, researchers showed one mutation could allow the virus to switch its specificity to human receptors, increasing the risk of human-to-human transmission.

In order to avoid infection, the general public are advised to avoid contact with sick birds or potentially contaminated material such as carcasses or feces. People working with birds, such as conservationists or poultry workers, are advised to wear appropriate personal protection equipment.

The avian influenza hemagglutinin prefers to bind to alpha-2,3 sialic acid receptors, while the human influenza hemagglutinin prefers to bind to alpha-2,6 sialic acid receptors. This means that when the H5N1 strain infects humans, it will replicate in the lower respiratory tract (where alpha-2,3 sialic acid receptors are more plentiful in humans) and consequently cause viral pneumonia.

Between 2003 and December 2025, the World Health Organization has recorded 993 cases of confirmed H5N1 influenza, leading to 477 deaths. The true fatality rate is presumably lower because cases with mild symptoms may not have been identified as H5N1.

On January 6, 2025, the first death from avian influenza in the United States was recorded. This was the first case considered to officially link transmission of avian influenza to backyard flocks. The individual was reported to have been older than 65, had underlying medical problems as well as being in contact with multiple sick and dead birds from their backyard flock.

== Virology ==
=== Influenza virus nomenclature ===
Diagram of influenza nomenclature

To unambiguously describe a specific isolate of virus, researchers use the internationally accepted Influenza virus nomenclature, which describes, among other things, the species of animal from which the virus was isolated, and the place and year of collection. For example, A/chicken/Nakorn-Patom/Thailand/CU-K2/04(H5N1):

- A stands for the genus of influenza (A, B or C)
- chicken is the animal species the isolate was found in (note: human isolates lack this component term and are thus identified as human isolates by default)
- Nakorn-Patom/Thailand is the place this specific virus was isolated
- CU-K2 is the laboratory reference number that identifies it from other influenza viruses isolated at the same place and year
- 04 represents the year of isolation 2004
- H5 stands for the fifth of several known types of the protein hemagglutinin
- N1 stands for the first of several known types of the protein neuraminidase.

Other examples include: A/duck/Hong Kong/308/78(H5N3), and A/shoveler/Egypt/03(H5N2).

=== Genetic structure ===
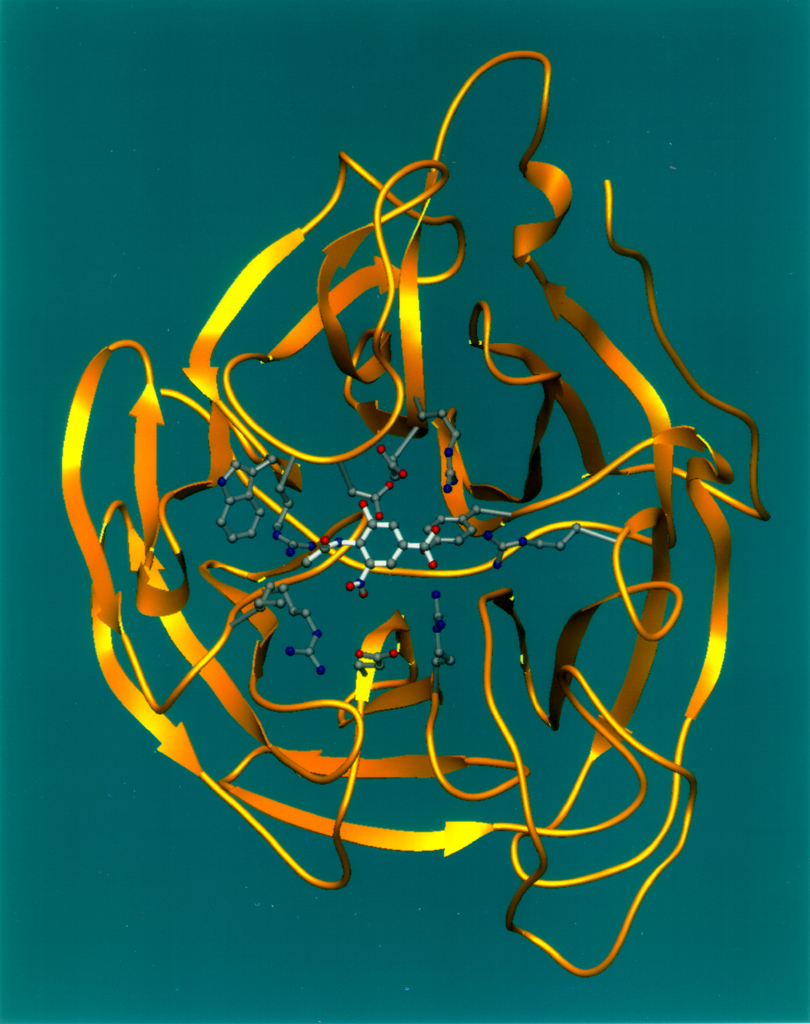
The N in H5N1 stands for "Neuraminidase", the protein depicted in this ribbon diagram.

H5N1 is a subtype of Influenza A virus. Like all subtypes it is an enveloped negative-sense RNA virus, with a segmented genome. Subtypes of IAV are defined by the combination of the antigenic hemagglutinin and neuraminidase proteins in the viral envelope. "H5N1" designates an IAV subtype that has a type 5 hemagglutinin (H) protein and a type-1 neuraminidase (N) protein. Further variations exist within the subtypes and can lead to very significant differences in the virus's ability to infect and cause disease, as well as to the severity of symptoms.

Influenza viruses have a relatively high mutation rate that is characteristic of RNA viruses. The segmentation of its genome facilitates genetic recombination by segment reassortment in hosts infected with two different strains of influenza viruses at the same time. Through a combination of mutation and genetic reassortment the virus can evolve to acquire new characteristics, enabling it to evade host immunity and occasionally to jump from one species of host to another.

== Prevention and treatment ==
=== Vaccine ===
Humans – Several "candidate" (unproved) vaccines are available in case an avian virus acquires the ability to infect and transmit among humans; as of July 2024 these include Aflunov, Celldemic and Seqirus/Audenz. Some governments have prepared strategic stockpiles of vaccines against the H5N1 subtype which is considered the biggest risk among subtypes. However, because the influenza virus is highly variable, any vaccine needs to be specifically targeted against the particular strain of virus which is causing concern. Existing influenza vaccine technologies can be adapted to a H5N1 strain causing the pandemic; in the event of an outbreak, the candidate vaccine would be rapidly tested for safety as well as efficacy against the zoonotic strain, and then authorised and distributed to vaccine manufacturers.

Poultry – it is possible to vaccinate poultry against specific strains of HPAI influenza. Vaccination should be combined with other control measures such as infection monitoring, early detection and biosecurity. In many countries, it is routine to vaccinate poultry against H5N1. In China, the world's biggest poultry producer, there has been a mandatory vaccination requirement since 2017; the vaccine is bivalent or trivalent, targeting the H5 and H7 subtypes of influenza A virus. It is manufactured using recombinant influenza virus.

=== Vaccine development ===
Given the prevalence of A/H5N1 in wild bird populations and the risks of the virus either infecting farmed animals or adapting to cause a human pandemic, there has been considerable interest in developing vaccines.

- In April 2026, an mRNA vaccine candidate developed by Moderna commenced Phase 3 clinical trials on humans in the UK and US.
- In April 2026, researchers at the University of Nebraska–Lincoln announced an experimental vaccine in early trials which is effective for cattle against multiple H5N1 strains.

=== Treatment ===
In the event of an outbreak of human H5N1, the main antiviral drugs recommended are neuraminidase inhibitors, such as zanamivir (Relenza) and oseltamivir (Tamiflu). These drugs can reduce the severity of symptoms if taken soon after infection and can also be taken as prophylaxis to decrease the risk of infection.

== Epidemiology ==
=== History ===
Influenza A/H5N1 was first detected in 1959 after an outbreak of highly pathogenic avian influenza in Scotland, which infected two flocks of chickens. The next detection, and the earliest infection of humans by H5N1, was an epizootic (an epidemic in nonhumans) of H5N1 influenza in Hong Kong's poultry population in 1997. This outbreak was stopped by the killing of the entire domestic poultry population within the territory. Human infection was confirmed in 18 individuals who had been in close contact with poultry, 6 of whom died.

Since then, avian A/H5N1 bird flu has become widespread in wild birds worldwide, with numerous outbreaks among both domestic and wild birds. An estimated half a billion farmed birds have been slaughtered in efforts to contain the virus.

=== Pandemic potential ===
Influenza viruses have a relatively high mutation rate that is characteristic of RNA viruses. The segmentation of the influenza A virus genome facilitates genetic recombination by segment reassortment in hosts who become infected with two different strains of influenza viruses at the same time; this could yield a novel strain with greater virulence or the ability to infect a wider range of host species, potentially leading to a human pandemic.

As of June 2024, there is concern about two subtypes of avian influenza which are circulating in wild bird populations worldwide, A/H5N1 and A/H7N9. Both of these have potential to devastate poultry stocks, and both have jumped to humans with relatively high case fatality rates. A/H5N1 in particular has infected a wide range of mammals and may be adapting to mammalian hosts.

=== Surveillance ===
The Global Influenza Surveillance and Response System (GISRS) is a global network of laboratories that monitor the spread of influenza with the aim to provide the World Health Organization with influenza control information and to inform vaccine development. Several millions of specimens are tested by the GISRS network annually through a network of laboratories in 127 countries. GISRS monitors avian, swine, and other potentially zoonotic influenza viruses as well as human viruses.

=== Transmission and prevention ===
The eight major flyways used by shorebirds (waders) on migration Pacific Mississippi West Atlantic East Atlantic Mediterranean and Black Sea West Asia and Africa Central Asia and India East Asia and Australasia

Birds – Influenza A viruses of various subtypes have a large reservoir in wild waterfowl, which can infect the respiratory and gastrointestinal tract without affecting the health of the host. They can then be carried by the bird over large distances especially during annual migration. Infected birds can shed avian influenza A viruses in their saliva, nasal secretions, and feces; susceptible birds become infected when they have contact with the virus as it is shed by infected birds. The virus can survive for long periods in water and at low temperatures, and can be spread from one farm to another on farm equipment. Domesticated birds (chickens, turkeys, ducks, etc.) may become infected with avian influenza A viruses through direct contact with infected waterfowl or other infected poultry, or through contact with contaminated feces or surfaces.

Avian influenza outbreaks in domesticated birds are of concern for several reasons. There is potential for low pathogenic avian influenza viruses (LPAI) to evolve into strains which are high pathogenic to poultry (HPAI), and subsequent potential for significant illness and death among poultry during outbreaks. Because of this, international regulations state that any detection of H5 or H7 subtypes (regardless of their pathogenicity) must be notified to the appropriate authority. It is also possible for avian influenza viruses to be transmitted to humans and other animals which have been exposed to infected birds, causing infection with unpredictable but sometimes fatal consequences.

When an HPAI infection is detected in poultry, it is normal to cull infected animals and those nearby in an effort to rapidly contain, control and eradicate the disease. This is done together with movement restrictions, improved hygiene and biosecurity, and enhanced surveillance.

Humans – Avian flu viruses, both HPAI and LPAI, can infect humans who are in close, unprotected contact with infected poultry. Incidents of cross-species transmission are rare, with symptoms ranging in severity from no symptoms or mild illness, to severe disease that resulted in death. As of February 2024, there have been very few instances of human-to-human transmission, and each outbreak has been limited to a few people. All subtypes of avian Influenza A have potential to cross the species barrier, with H5N1 and H7N9 considered the biggest threats.

In order to avoid infection, the general public are advised to avoid contact with sick birds or potentially contaminated material such as carcasses or feces. People working with birds, such as conservationists or poultry workers, are advised to wear appropriate personal protection equipment.

Cattle – The H5N1 avian flu variant had first been identified in cattle around March 25, 2024. Since then the variant has been identified in 845 individual cases across 16 states as of early December, 2024. Recent tests have shown that the most common clade of the H5N1 variant found in cattle has been Eurasian lineage goose/Guangdong clade 2.3.4.4b which is also commonly found in commercial poultry and wild birds. According to the American Veterinary Medical Association, common clinical signs of H5N1 infection in dairy cattle include symptoms such as a reduced appetite, lower milk production, and abnormal milk appearance (e.g., thickened or discolored). While lactating cows are the most affected, illness is still often only reported in less than 10% of a herd, with a low mortality or culling rate of 2% or less. The United States Department of Agriculture (USDA) has started to require testing of lactating dairy cattle before interstate movement or travel and now mandates reporting of positive test results to the Animal and Plant Health Inspection Service (APHIS). Internationally, Canada tightened import rules for U.S. dairy cattle as a response. The USDA then introduced various forms of financial support for producers to bolster biosecurity and offset losses from production disruptions as a result of the spread. As for the future, the American Association of Bovine Practitioners (AABP) and the AVMA are coordinating with federal and state officials to provide further biosecurity guidance.

The commercial milk supply has not been affected, as milk from H5N1-affected animals is almost always diverted or destroyed before entering the food supply, and then as milk goes through pasteurization the virus becomes effectively inactivated. Testing of retail dairy products, including milk, butter, cheese, and ice cream, has found no live, infectious H5N1 virus which further supports the FDA's position that pasteurized milk is safe for consumption. The USDA's Food Safety and Inspection Service (FSIS) has also tested ground beef and muscle samples from culled dairy cows, with the results also confirming the absence of H5N1 in meat products. Any meat from condemned cows is prohibited from entering the human food supply. Beginning in September 2024, the FSIS has expanded testing of dairy cows that are going to be slaughtered to further safeguard the meat supply. For states permitting raw milk sales, the FDA has advised halting such sales if the milk may contain viable H5N1 virus. In December, a California dairy recalled raw milk and cream after multiple samples tested positive for the virus, which underscored the risks of consuming unpasteurized dairy products. The FDA recommended heat-treating milk intended for calf feeding to eliminate harmful pathogens. Consumers were also advised by the FDA to avoid raw milk, properly handle raw meat, and cook meat to an internal temperature of at least 165 °F, including meat used for pet food.

Other animals – a wide range of other animals have been affected by avian flu, generally due to eating birds which had been infected. There have been instances where transmission of the disease between mammals, including seals and cattle, may have occurred.

=== Mortality ===
Confirmed human cases and mortality rate of avian influenza (H5N1) 2003–2025
Year	Cases	Deaths	CFR
2003	4	4	100%
2004	46	32	70%
2005	98	43	44%
2006	115	79	69%
2007	88	59	67%
2008	44	33	75%
2009	73	32	44%
2010	48	24	50%
2011	62	34	55%
2012	32	20	63%
2013	39	25	64%
2014	52	22	42%
2015	145	42	29%
2016	10	3	30%
2017	4	2	50%
2018	0	0	N/A
2019	1	1	100%
2020	1	0	0%
2021	2	1	50%
2022	6	1	17%
2023	12	4	33%
2024	81	4	5%
2025	30	12	40%
Total	993	477	48%

Updated 22 Jan 2026
Source: World Health Organization Global Influenza Program Cumulative Cases Report ·

== Outbreaks ==
=== 1959–1997 ===
- A highly pathogenic strain of H5N1 caused flu outbreaks in 1959 in Scotland in chickens.
- In 1997, in Hong Kong, 18 humans were infected and 6 died in the first known case of H5N1 infecting humans. Subsequently 1.3 million chickens were culled in the territory of Hong Kong. The government also suspended the import of chickens from mainland China.

=== 2003 ===
- In 2003 the first cases in humans since 1997 were diagnosed. Three people in one family were infected after visiting Fujian province in mainland China and 2 died.
- By midyear of 2003 outbreaks of poultry disease caused by H5N1 occurred in Asia, but were not recognized as such. In December animals in a Thai zoo died after eating infected chicken carcasses. Later that month H5N1 infection was detected in 3 flocks in the Republic of Korea.

=== 2004 ===
- In January 2004 a major new outbreak of H5N1 surfaced in Vietnam and Thailand's poultry industry, and within weeks spread to ten countries and regions in Asia, including Indonesia, South Korea, Japan and China.
- Variants have been found in a number of domestic cats, leopards, and tigers in Thailand, with high lethality. "The Thailand Zoo tiger outbreak killed more than 140 tigers, causing health officials to make the decision to cull all the sick tigers in an effort to stop the zoo from becoming a reservoir for H5N1 influenza.

=== 2005 ===
- In January 2005 an outbreak of avian influenza affected thirty three out of sixty four cities and provinces in Vietnam, leading to the forced killing of nearly 1.2 million poultry.
- In April 2005 there begins an unprecedented die-off of over 6,000 migratory birds at Qinghai Lake in central China over three months. Later in the year H5N1 was detected in Kazakhstan, Mongolia and Russia, Turkey, Romania, Croatia and Kuwait.
- H5N1 was found to be infecting pigs in Indonesia, but without causing symptoms.

=== 2006 ===
- In January 2006, the Turkish town of Doğubayazıt, was the centre of a H5N1 outbreak. Four children died from the disease after playing with chicken carcasses. 75,000 chickens in Doğubayazıt and in surrounding villages were killed as a precaution.
- In the first two months of 2006 H5N1 spread to India, north Africa, and Europe in wild bird populations.
- February/March 2006 – A dead cat infected with the H5N1 bird flu virus was found in Germany.

=== 2007 ===
- Significant outbreaks recorded in Japan, Hungary, Russia, United Kingdom, Pakistan, Turkey, Afghanistan, Myanmar, Bangladesh, Saudi Arabia, Ghana, Malaysia, Germany, Czech Republic, Togo, France and India.

=== 2008–2019 ===
Many more outbreaks are recorded, in almost every country in the world, affecting both wild birds and poultry, with occasional spillover events infecting humans.

=== 2020–2026 ===
Outbreaks of avian influenza subtype H5N1 have been occurring since 2020, with cases reported from every continent. Some species of wild aquatic birds act as natural asymptomatic carriers of influenza A viruses, which can infect poultry, other bird species, mammals (including humans) if they come into close contact with infected feces or contaminated material, or by eating infected birds. The virus strain involved in the global outbreak is classified as H5N1 clade 2.3.4.4b, which has adapted to cause significant outbreaks in a broader range of species, mammals included.

H5N6 and H5N8 viruses with the H5-2.3.4.4b hemagglutinin (HA) gene became the dominant avian influenza viruses globally in 2018–2020 (see 2020–2023 H5N8 outbreak). In 2020, reassortment (genetic "swapping") between these H5-2.3.4.4b viruses and other strains of avian influenza led to the emergence of a H5N1 strain with a H5-2.3.4.4b gene. The virus then spread across Europe, first detected there in the autumn of 2020, before spreading to Africa and Asia. It continues to swap genes with local flu viruses as it crosses the globe.

As of June 2026, H5N1 avian influenza is

- widespread in wild bird populations, in all continents
- frequently spilling over into poultry flocks, necessitating mass slaughter
- established in US dairy cows
- causing sporadic human cases, generally in people exposed to infected birds or cattle
- known to have infected at least 43 species of mammal

=== Mammalian infections ===
In October 2022 an outbreak of H5N1 on a Spanish mink farm showed evidence of being the first recorded case of mammal-to-mammal transmission, with 4 percent of the farm's mink population dying from H5N1-related haemorrhagic pneumonia. This coincided with H5N1 detections in the area among gulls and other seabirds, which are the presumed source of the outbreak.

A mass Caspian seal die-off in December 2022, with 700 infected seals found dead along the Caspian Sea coastline of Russia's Dagestan republic, worried researchers regarding the possibility that wild mammal-to-mammal spread had begun. The cause of the Caspian seal deaths is unclear and may relate to an annual asphyxiation condition.

Between January and October 2023, at least 24,000 South American sea lions died from H5N1 flu, with the outbreak starting on the Pacific coast of Peru, moving down the coast to Chile and then up the Atlantic coast of Argentina. A mass die-off of 95% of southern elephant seal pups on Argentina's Valdés Peninsula in 2023 also raised concerns of mammal-to-mammal spread, as nursing pups would have had less exposure to birds. It is normal for about 34-55% of elephant seal pups to die in the first year. A necropsy is an important process for determining cause of death, but necropsies were not performed on the South American seals.

In April 2024, spread of H5N1 amongst dairy cow herds in nine states of the USA suggested cow-to-cow transmission, possibly occurring while the animals were being milked. It has been noted that there were months of gaps in the data as in cattle it was not consistently a reportable disease in the USA. Although mortality in bovines infected with H5N1 is rare, viable virus can be shed in the milk. Around 50% of cats that lived on the affected dairy farms and that were fed unpasteurised milk from symptomatic cows died within a few days from severe systemic influenza infection, raising significant concerns of cross-species mammal-to-mammal transmission.

In March 2025 a sheep was found in Yorkshire, UK, infected with H5N1; it was culled. Extensive testing suggests that it was the sole non-avian victim locally, with, for example, its own lambs testing negative.

A further die off of elephant seal pups with over 75% mortality occurred on Heard Island, in the Indian Ocean in the summer of 2025/26. The investigation at Heard Island involved drones and influenza testing but it did not involve necropsies.

== See also ==
- Antigenic shift
- Avian influenza virus
- Favipiravir
- Fujian flu
- H5N1 clinical trials
- H7N9
- Influenzavirus A
- International Conference on Emerging Infectious Diseases
- National Influenza Centers
- Swine influenza
- Zoonosis
