= 2008 H5N1 outbreak in West Bengal =

Bird flu outbreak in India

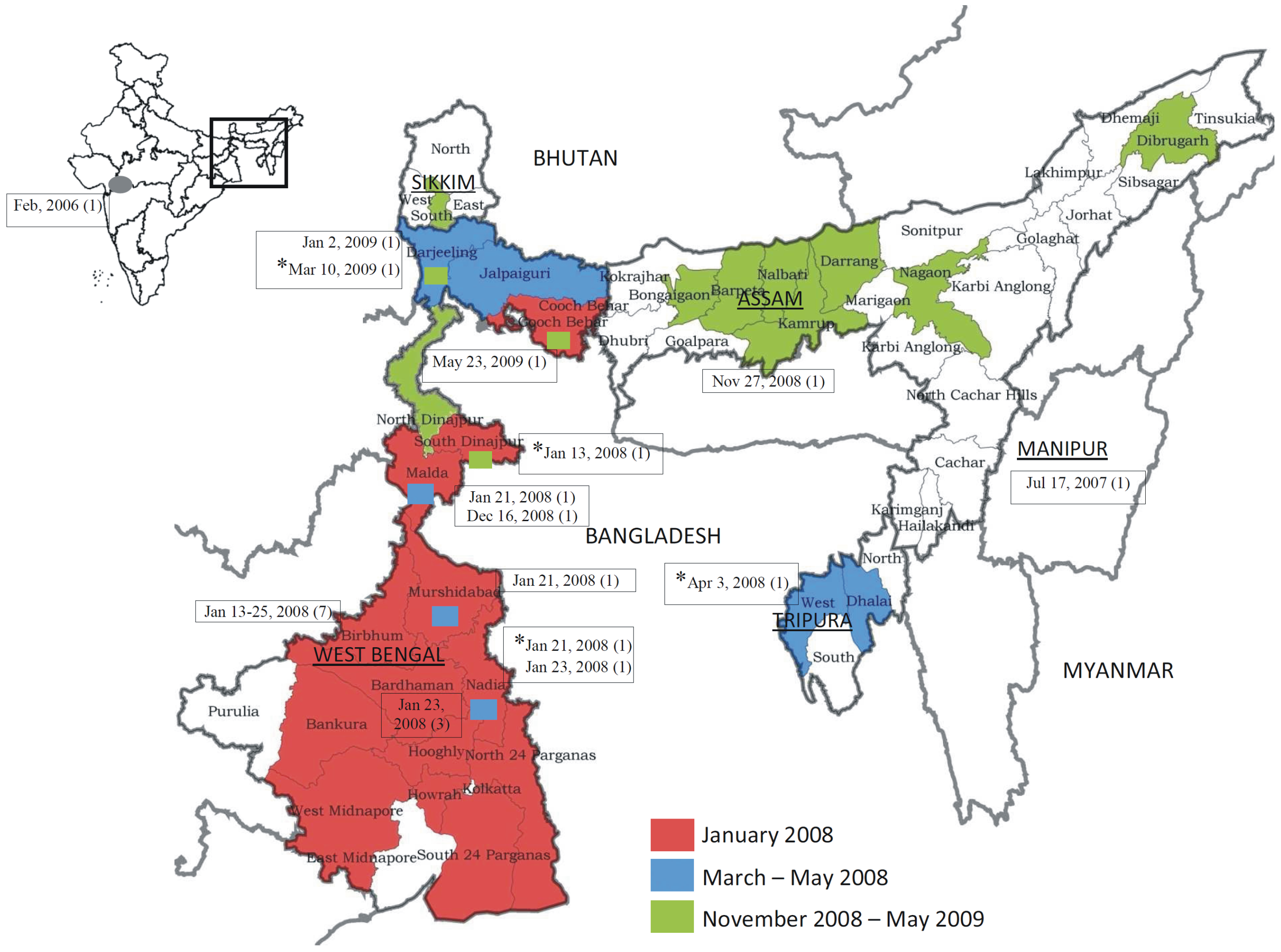
- Disease: Avian influenza
- Pathogen: H5N1
- Location: West Bengal

The 2008 bird flu outbreak in West Bengal was an occurrence of avian influenza in West Bengal, India which began in January 2008. The infection was caused by the H5N1 subtype of the Influenza A virus and impacted at least thirteen districts, including Birbhum, Nadia, Murshidabad, Burdwan, Hooghly, Cooch Behar, Malda, Bankura, Purulia, Howrah, West Midnapore, South 24 Parganas and South Dinajpur. A range of precautions were instituted including a large cull of chickens, eggs, and poultry birds, the imposition of segregation zones, and a disinfection programme for the plant. The government put a blanket ban on the movement of poultry birds from West Bengal 5 February 2008, but repealed it a week later.

The first outbreak in 2008 began in January, with confirmation from the World Organisation for Animal Health established through lab tests on 15 January 2008. This outbreak continued through 31 October 2008. A second outbreak began in Assam in November 2008, confirmed through lab tests on 27 November 2008. This outbreak continued through 27 October 2009. A third wave occurred from 15 January 2010 through 2 June 2010. A fourth wave followed in Assam in February 2011, confirmed through lab tests on 16 February. That outbreak did not reach West Bengal. A fifth outbreak began in August 2011, once again in Assam, confirmed through lab tests on 8 September 2011. and continued through 28 December 2011; the district of Nadia was affected.

== Spread ==
The World Organisation of Animal Health stated that the villages of Rampurhat, Nalhati, and Mayureswar in Birbhum initially reported the outbreak on 4 January 2008. A farm in Dakshin Dinajpur reported an initial outbreak on 7 January 2008. However, local officials did not notify the central government of the "hundreds" of dead birds reported by villagers in Rampurhat as early as 15 December 2007. Further, Dr. Pradeep Kumar had issued a statement to the Chief Secretaries of each state advising them of the outbreak spreading from Pakistan and Myanmar on 24 December 2007.

By 10 January, 9,500 bird deaths had been reported. The number rose to 96,010 as reported by seven districts on 19 January. The government set a goal of culling 2,000,000 birds by 19 January, but by 23 January, only 430,000 had been killed. Veterinarians were deployed into West Bengal from eight other states with the goal of eliminating 2.1 million birds by the end of January 2008. Animal husbandry minister Anisur Rahaman reported that nearly 2.5 million birds had been slaughtered in two weeks. This first wave resulted in the death or destruction of 4,441,226 birds; West Bengal accounted for 4,248,213 of those.

Timeline of Spread, 1st Wave
District	Date of Confirmation
Birbhum	15 January
South Dinajpur	15 January
Murshidabad	17 January
Bankura	19 January
Burdwan	19 January
Malda	19 January
Nadia	19 January
Howrah	22 January
Purulia	22 January
Cooch Behar	23 January
Hooghly	23 January
South 24 Paraganas	25 January
West Midnapore (Paschim Mednipur)	25 January
Darjeeling	1 May

The second wave reached Malda in West Bengal 13 December 2008. Local governments dispatched teams to begin destroying avian livestock on 4 January 2009. During this wave, a total of 672,655 birds died or were destroyed across India with West Bengal accounting for 156,307 of those.

Timeline of Spread, 2nd Wave
District	Date of Confirmation
Malda	13 December 2008
Darjeeling	1 January 2009
Jalpaiguri	3 January 2009
Cooch Behar	29 January 2009
South Dinajjpur	14 February 2009

The next wave known to have affected West Bengal through reports from the World Organisation for Animal Health began in August 2011, reaching Nadia on 14 September. Data indicates that only Nadia was affected, with the outbreak lasting through 28 December 2011 and resulting in the death or destruction of 48,581 birds.

== Containment efforts ==
No human infection of H5N1 was reported in West Bengal throughout the outbreak in 2008 and 2009. There had been concern due to three samples being submitted to the National Institute of Communicable Diseases for testing, which were all declared negative by 22 January 2008. By the time of the second wave, epidemiologists expressed concern that the strain might mutate with seasonal flu and kill millions, reigniting concern of contagion among the human populace.

The ministry of Animal Resource Development admitted to not wanting to affect the ₹5,000,000,000 West Bengali poultry industry, but by the end of January 2008, the region's poultry industry had already lost ₹1,000,000,000. The culling workers hired by either the Ministry of Health and Family Welfare or the ARD had no medical training, no testing equipment, and left the jobs when they did not receive the expected compensation of ₹50.

Officials have been criticized for their conflicting messaging throughout the pandemic. Sharad Pawar, Agriculture Minister, laid the blame for the lack of action on the CPM, with local CPM leaders encouraging a resistance to culling efforts.

A general lack of knowledge among poultry farmers as to the nature and virulence of H5N1 has also been acknowledged as a possible cause of its range and longevity. The government began issuing leaflets by 25 January 2008 in an effort to educate the public, while the Border Security Force closed the Dharla River ferry and police officers accompanied culling workers to prevent any retaliation from villagers. However, poultry farmers smuggled birds from the area due to low compensation from the government, leaving officials to raid the farms at night. Initially, the government offered only ₹40 for a country chicken, ₹30 for a broiler chicken, and ₹10 for chicks. In Margram, villagers still sold the chickens that had died from the flu for ₹10 per 1 kilogram (2.2 lb). In one village, locals demanded infrastructure be built in exchange for handing over their poultry.
