= Live attenuated influenza vaccine =

Nasal influenza vaccine

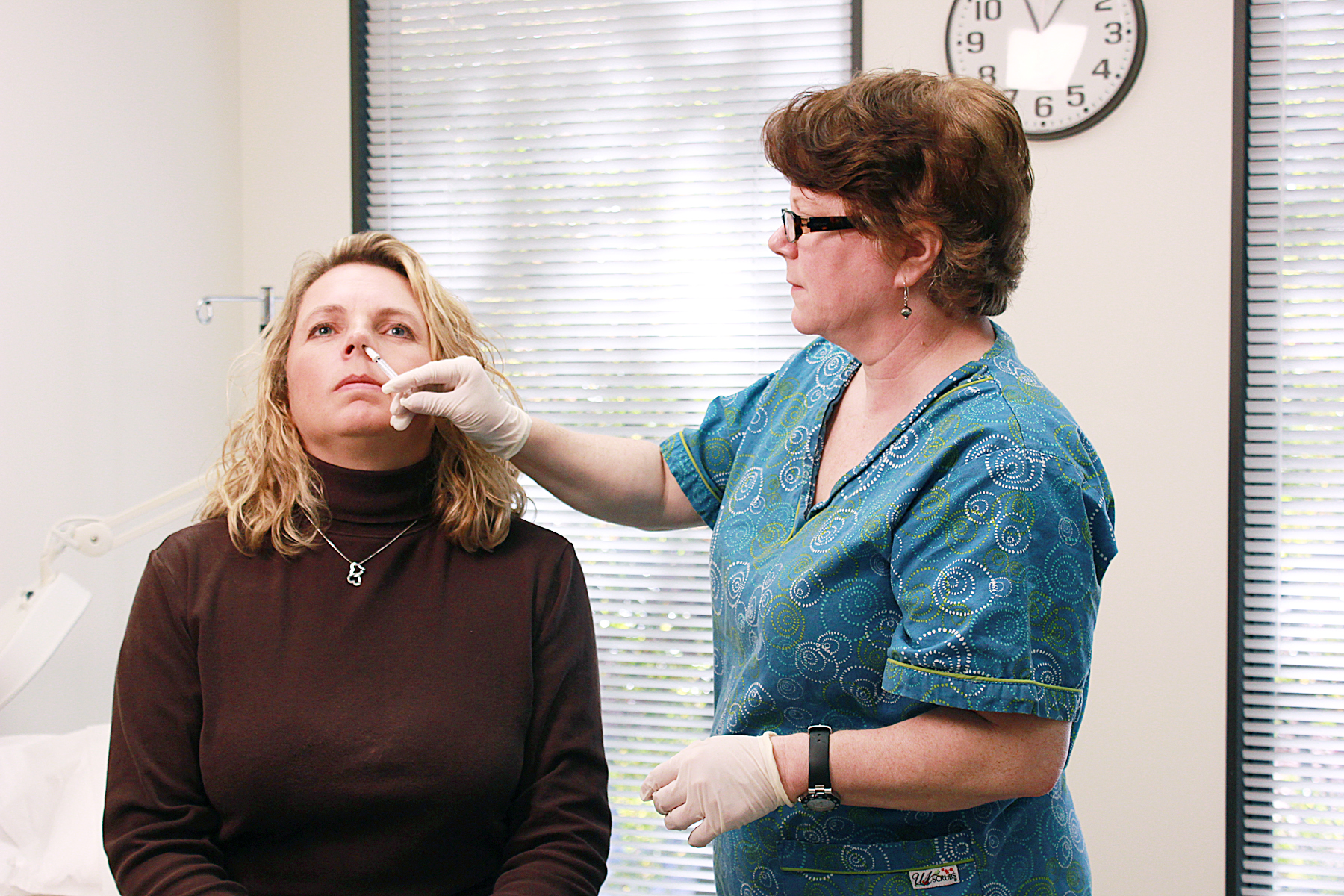
- Nurse administering the FluMist product

Vaccine description
- Target: Influenza
- Vaccine type: Attenuated

Clinical data
- Trade names: Flumist, Flumist Quadrivalent, Fluenz Tetra
- AHFS/Drugs.com: Monograph
- License data: US DailyMed: Flumist
- Routes of administration: Intranasal
- ATC code: J07BB03 (WHO)

Legal status
- Legal status: AU: S4 (Prescription only); US: ℞-only; EU: Rx-only; In general: ℞ (Prescription only)

Identifiers
- CAS Number: 1704512-59-3
- ChemSpider: none
- KEGG: D12874

Live attenuated influenza vaccine (LAIV) is a type of influenza vaccine in the form of a nasal spray that is recommended for the prevention of influenza.‍‍

It is an attenuated live vaccine, unlike other influenza vaccines, which are inactivated vaccines. LAIV is administered intranasally,‍ while inactivated vaccines are administered by intramuscular injection. LAIV is sold under the brand names FluMist and FluMist Quadrivalent in the United States; and the brand name Fluenz Tetra in the European Union.‍‍ FluMist was first introduced in 2003 by MedImmune.‍‍

In the United States, FluMist is approved for self- or caregiver-administration.‍‍ It is the first influenza vaccine that does not need to be administered by a health care provider.‍

== Medical uses ==
The live attenuated influenza vaccine is used to provide protection against the flu, caused by infection with influenza viruses.‍‍‍

== Contraindications ==
The use of the live attenuated influenza vaccine is contraindicated, and it should therefore not be used, in the following populations:

- Children under 24 months of age, due to increased risk of wheezing‍
- Individuals with a history of hypersensitivity to previous influenza vaccination‍
- Individuals with a history of hypersensitivity, especially anaphylactic reactions, to eggs, egg proteins, gentamicin, gelatin, or arginine or to any other ingredient in the formulation‍
- People with a medical condition that places them at high risk for complications from influenza, including those with chronic heart or lung disease, such as asthma or reactive airways disease‍
- People with medical conditions such as diabetes or kidney failure or people with illnesses that weaken the immune system, or who take medications that can weaken the immune system‍
- Children less than 5 years old with a history of recurrent wheezing‍
- Children or adolescents receiving aspirin‍
- People with a history of Guillain–Barré syndrome, a rare disorder of the nervous system‍
- Pregnant women‍
- People who have a severe allergy to chicken eggs or who are allergic to any of the nasal spray vaccine components‍

== Production ==
The live attenuated vaccine is based on a flu strain that does not cause disease, that replicates well at relatively cold temperatures (about 25 °C (77 °F), for incubation purposes), and replicates poorly at body temperature (which minimizes risk to humans). Genes that code for surface proteins (targeted antigens) are combined with this host using genetic reassortment from strains that are projected to be circulating widely in the coming months. The resulting viruses are then incubated in chicken eggs and chick kidney cells. To make the refrigerated version, the virus is purified in centrifuges through a sucrose gradient, then packaged with sucrose, phosphate, glutamate, arginine, and hydrolyzed pig gelatin.‍

== Risks ==
Even though the virus in the live attenuated influenza vaccine (LAIV) is attenuated (low in virulence), it is still a living virus, and may cause an infection with complications in people with weakened immune systems or other underlying medical conditions. LAIV is recommended only for people 2–49 years of age. People who have a weakened immune system, pregnant women, and people with certain chronic diseases may not be eligible to receive the vaccine.‍ In contrast, inactivated virus vaccines contain no living virus, and cannot cause a live infection. Persons receiving LAIV may shed small amounts of the vaccine virus during the first week. People coming in contact with the vaccinated person are not considered to be at risk, unless their immune systems are severely weakened (for example, bone marrow transplant recipients).‍

== History ==
The live attenuated influenza vaccine (LAIV) was developed by the University of Michigan School of Public Health in Ann Arbor, Michigan and later by Aviron, in Mountain View, California, under the sponsorship of the National Institutes of Health (NIH) in the 1990s. MedImmune purchased Aviron in 2002, and the US Food and Drug Administration (FDA) approved LAIV in June 2003.‍‍

The FDA initially approved LAIV only for healthy people aged 5 to 49 because of concerns over possible side effects. LAIV is approved and recommended for healthy children 24 months of age and older. The FDA approved the unfrozen refrigerated version for the same age group (ages 5–49) in August 2006, following completion of phase III clinical trials.‍

The cold-adapted version of the vaccine is called CAIV-T, and is stable for storage in a refrigerator, rather than requiring freezer storage as did the originally-approved formulation. Approved for the 2007-2008 flu season,‍ the refrigerated formulation can be distributed more cheaply, making it more price-competitive with injected vaccines. The higher price hampered sales of the original frozen version of FluMist; FluMist was initially priced higher than injectable vaccines, and sold only 500,000 of the four million doses produced its first year on the market, despite a comparative shortage of flu vaccine in fall 2004.‍ The price was sharply lowered the next year, and MedImmune reported distributing 1.6 million doses in 2005.‍ Because of the price drop, despite selling almost three times as many doses in 2005, the company reported $21 million in revenue from FluMist sales,‍ (Note: equivalent to $32 million in 2024‍) compared to $48 million the previous year.‍‍ (Note: equivalent to $76 million in 2024‍)

== Society and culture ==
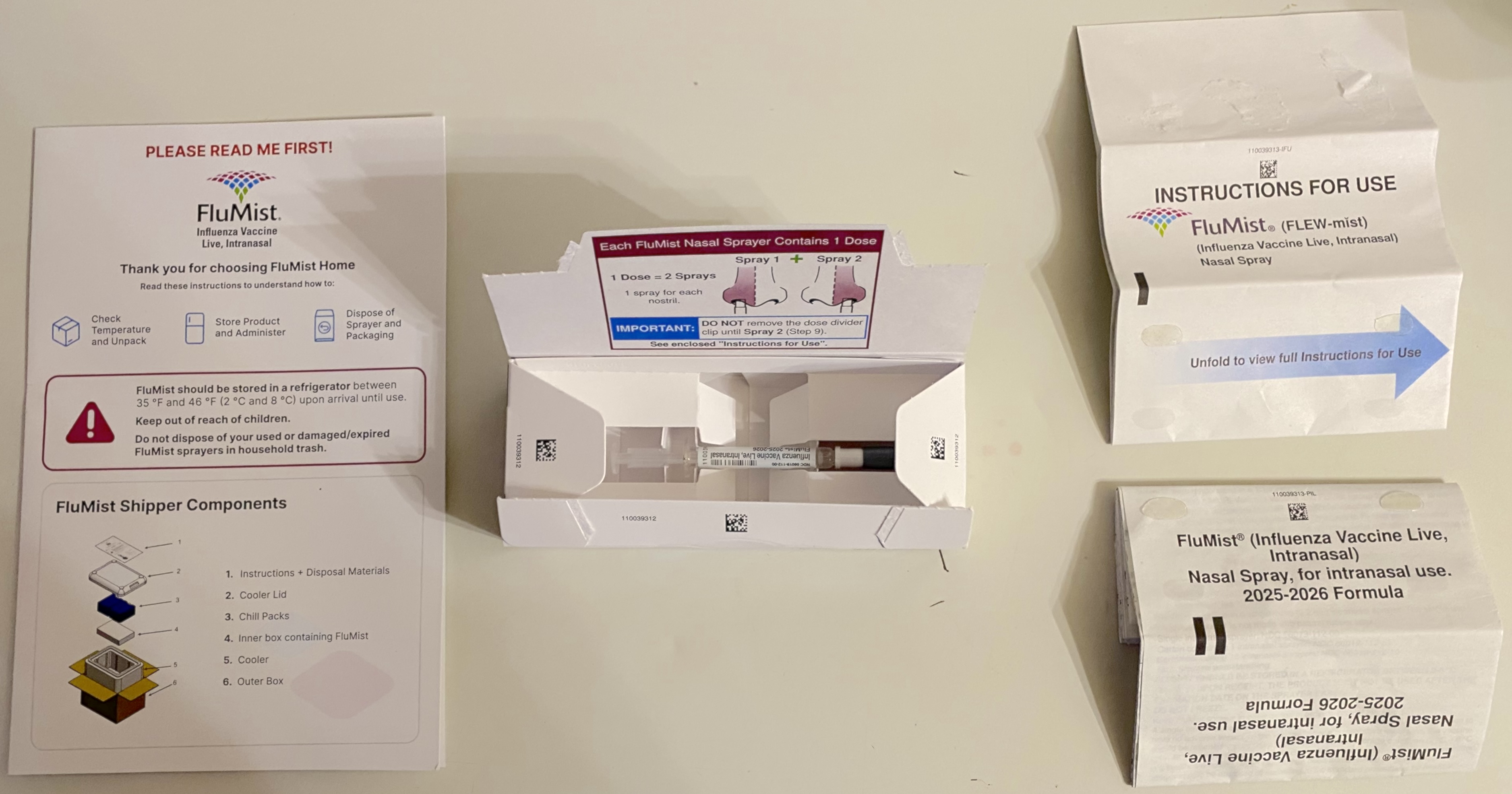
An example of a Flumist home influenza vaccine kit, featuring unpacking and administration instructions, safety warnings, and the box containing the vaccine itself. The kit is shipped in a styrofoam cooler with cold packs to maintain the vaccine at a refrigerated temperature (not shown).

MedImmune is one company that manufactures the live attenuated influenza vaccine, which it sells under the brand name FluMist in the United States, Canada, and Japan,‍ and the brand name Fluenz Tetra in the UK and European Union.‍ For the 2010–2011 flu season, FluMist was the only live attenuated influenza vaccine approved by the FDA for use in the US.‍‍ All other FDA-approved lots were inactivated virus vaccines.‍ In September 2009, a live attenuated influenza vaccine for the novel H1N1 influenza virus was approved‍ and the seasonal intranasal vaccine was approved by the European Medicines Agency (EMA) for use in the European Union in 2011.‍ The quadrivalent vaccine version was approved for use in the European Union in 2013.‍

As of 2007, the only other company holding live attenuated influenza vaccine rights is BioDiem of Australia.‍ BioDiem licensed rights to private production of the vaccine in China to Changchun BCHT Biotechnology, which also holds public rights for production in China sublicensed from the World Health Organization.‍

It was the first and, as of 2007, the only live attenuated vaccine for influenza available outside of Europe.‍ In September 2009, a live attenuated influenza vaccine for the novel H1N1 influenza virus was approved.‍ In 2011, the vaccine was approved by the European Medicines Agency (EMA) for use in the European Union under the brand name Fluenz.‍‍

AstraZeneca acquired MedImmune in 2007 and retired the MedImmune name.‍‍ In October 2024, Time magazine named AstraZeneca FluMist (an "at-home nasal vaccine") as one of the best inventions of 2024.‍

=== Legal status ===
In May 2024, the Committee for Medicinal Products for Human Use (CHMP) of the European Medicines Agency (EMA) adopted a positive opinion, recommending the granting of a marketing authorization for Fluenz, intended for the prevention of influenza disease in children and adolescents.‍‍ The applicant for this medicinal product is AstraZeneca AB.‍

In September 2024, the US FDA approved FluMist for self- or caregiver-administration. The FDA granted the approval of FluMist to MedImmune LLC.‍

== Research ==
The live attenuated influenza vaccine is designed to be quickly modifiable to present the surface antigens of seasonal flu. This modifiability could also allow it to be quickly customized as a vaccine against a pandemic influenza if one were to emerge. In light of the global spread of H5N1, ways of reducing human mortality in the event of an H5N1 pandemic have been investigated. Modifying FluMist to serve as a specific human H5N1 vaccine is among the measures studied.‍

In June 2006, the US National Institutes of Health (NIH) began enrolling participants in a Phase I H5N1 study of an intranasal influenza vaccine candidate based on MedImmune's live, attenuated vaccine technology.‍

In September 2006, the US National Institute of Allergy and Infectious Diseases (NIAID) reported that inoculation with a live attenuated influenza vaccine modified to present surface antigens of certain H5N1 variants provided broad protection against other H5N1 variants in mouse and ferret models.‍ Attenuated live viruses were found protective against H5N1 in mice and chickens in a 2009 study.‍

"Several trials have reported that live attenuated influenza vaccines can boost virus-specific CTLs as well as mucosal and serum antibodies and provide broad cross-protection against heterologous human influenza A viruses." (58, 59)‍ "[V]accine formulas inducing heterosubtypic T cell–mediated immunity may confer broad protection against avian and human influenza A viruses."‍
