= Bharat Biotech COVID-19 vaccine =

Bharat Biotech COVID-19 vaccine may refer to one or both of the following:

- Covaxin, a whole-inactivated-virus-based vaccine delivered by injection
- iNCOVACC, an adenovirus vectored intranasal COVID-19 vaccine
