= Human mortality from H5N1 =

Human Mortality from H5N1 As of April 11, 2007
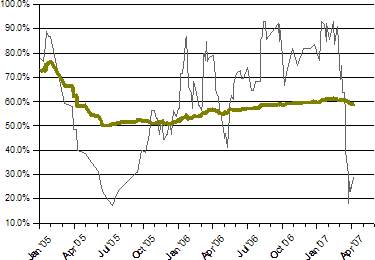
- Source: WHO Confirmed Human Cases of H5N1: The thin line represents average mortality of recent cases. The thicker line represents mortality averaged over all cases.; According to WHO: "Assessment of mortality rates and the time intervals between symptom onset and hospitalization and between symptom onset and death suggests that the illness pattern has not changed substantially during the three years."

H5N1 influenza virus is a type of influenza A virus which mostly infects birds. H5N1 flu is a concern because its global spread may constitute a pandemic threat. The yardstick for human mortality from H5N1 is the case-fatality rate (CFR); the ratio of the number of confirmed human deaths resulting from infection of H5N1 to the number of those confirmed cases of infection with the virus. For example, if there are 100 confirmed cases of a disease and 50 die as a consequence, then the CFR is 50%. The case fatality rate does not take into account cases of a disease which are unconfirmed or undiagnosed, perhaps because symptoms were mild and unremarkable or because of a lack of diagnostic facilities. The Infection Fatality Rate (IFR) is adjusted to allow for undiagnosed cases.

The IFR is central to pandemic planning. In previous influenza pandemics (not caused by H5N1), IFR estimates have ranged from to 2-3% for the 1918 pandemic, to about 0.6% for the 1957 pandemic, to 0.2% for the 1968 pandemic.

Between 2003 and December 2025, the World Health Organization has recorded 993 cases of confirmed H5N1 influenza, leading to 477 deaths. The true fatality rate is presumably lower because cases with mild symptoms may not have been identified as H5N1.

H5N1 infections in humans are generally caused by bird to human transmission of the virus. Until May 2006, the WHO estimate of the number of human to human transmissions had been "two or three cases". On May 24, 2006, Dr. Julie L. Gerberding, director of the United States Centers for Disease Control and Prevention in Atlanta, estimated that there had been "at least three." On May 30, Maria Cheng, a WHO spokeswoman, said there were "probably about half a dozen," but that no one "has got a solid number." The cases of suspected human to human transmission that continue to be found have been isolated and contained, and include transmission among members of a family in Sumatra, Indonesia in June 2006 as well as earlier and later instances arising in other countries. However, no pandemic strain of H5N1 has yet been found. The key point is that, at present, "the virus is not spreading efficiently or sustainably among humans."

H5N1 vaccines for chickens exist and are sometimes used, although there are many difficulties that make it especially difficult to decide whether vaccination will do more harm than good. In the U.S. H5N1 pre-pandemic vaccines exist in quantities sufficient to inoculate a few million people and might be useful for priming to "boost the immune response to a different H5N1 vaccine tailor-made years later to thwart an emerging pandemic". Japan has inoculated 6,000 health care workers with a pre-pandemic vaccine, and is planning how to proceed with widespread vaccinations, particularly workers who would provide utilities during an outbreak. Switzerland is also considering preemptive vaccination to protect the general public. H5N1 pandemic vaccines and the technologies to rapidly create them are in the H5N1 clinical trials stage but cannot be verified as useful until after a pandemic strain emerges. Efforts to identify the changes that might result in a human-communicable strain have resulted in laboratory-generated H5N1 with substantially greater affinity for human cellular receptors after a change of just two of the H5 surface proteins. Significantly, mouse antibodies were 10 times less potent against the mutants than against the pre-mutated viruses.

== H5N1 cases in humans ==
A graphic exhibiting total cases and mortality incidence is kept current by the WHO at https://www.who.int/teams/global-influenza-programme/avian-influenza/avian-a-h5n1-virus and complements the country-specific information shown below.

Country-specific totals of cases and deaths kept current by the WHO may be viewed by clicking through the links provided at Global influenza virological surveillance and the map links provided here Map Gallery Search Results Global influenza virological surveillance (in the Global Health Observatory)

Confirmed human cases and mortality rate of avian influenza (H5N1) 2003–2025
Year	Cases	Deaths	CFR
2003	4	4	100%
2004	46	32	70%
2005	98	43	44%
2006	115	79	69%
2007	88	59	67%
2008	44	33	75%
2009	73	32	44%
2010	48	24	50%
2011	62	34	55%
2012	32	20	63%
2013	39	25	64%
2014	52	22	42%
2015	145	42	29%
2016	10	3	30%
2017	4	2	50%
2018	0	0	N/A
2019	1	1	100%
2020	1	0	0%
2021	2	1	50%
2022	6	1	17%
2023	12	4	33%
2024	81	4	5%
2025	30	12	40%
Total	993	477	48%

Updated 22 Jan 2026
Source: World Health Organization Global Influenza Program Cumulative Cases Report ·

== History ==
A strain of H5N1 killed chickens in 1959 in Scotland and turkeys in 1991 in England. This strain was "highly pathogenic" (deadly to birds) but caused neither illness nor death in humans. "The precursor of the H5N1 influenza virus that spread to humans in 1997 was first detected in Guangdong, China, in 1996, when it caused a moderate number of deaths in geese and attracted very little attention." In 1997, in Hong Kong, 18 humans were infected and 6 died in the first known case of H5N1 infecting humans. H5N1 had evolved from a zero mortality rate to a 33% mortality rate.

The first report, in the current wave of HPAI A(H5N1) outbreaks, was of an outbreak that began December 10, 2003 in the Republic of Korea and continued for fourteen weeks. This strain caused asymptomatic infections in humans and may have died out, like the 1959 strain, so that its low mortality level would have little value for predicting the mortality rate of a pandemic evolving from existing HPAI A(H5N1) strains. The apparently extinct strain that caused human deaths from H5N1 in the Northern part of Vietnam in 2003, 2004 and 2005 also had a much lower case mortality rate than the currently existing strains. Changes are occurring in H5N1 that are increasing its pathogenicity in mammals.

From inception through 2007, the total number of WHO-confirmed cases was 349, with 216 of those fatalities (as reported by the U.N. on January 15, 2008, confirming earlier deaths) reflecting a 62% fatality rate among WHO-confirmed cases through 2007. These overall figures fail to bring forward fluctuations that have appeared from year to year and in particular geographic areas. In 2005, when a markedly less-lethal strain in Northern Vietnam was responsible for most of the cases reported worldwide, only 42 of 97 people confirmed by the WHO to be infected with H5N1 died — a 43% fatality rate. In 2006, the case fatality ratio was higher among the WHO-confirmed cases, with 79 deaths among 114 confirmed cases.— or 69%. In 2007, 59 of the 86 WHO-confirmed cases ended in death, again a 69% fatality rate. And 24 of the first 31 cases of 2008 (to April 30, 2008) have been fatal, or 77%.

The higher total case fatality ratio after the end of 2005 may reflect the widespread circulation in Vietnam of a less-lethal clade of H5N1 in 2005, which was subsequently brought under control. The change was nonetheless interpreted by some as indicating that the virus itself was becoming more deadly over time. In fact, when less-virulent strains die off, the surviving strains are the more virulent. Such difficulties in interpretation underscore that the global case fatality ratio can serve as but a crude and imperfect summary of the current complex situation with its many contributing factors, and not a clear or reliable predictive tool. If and when an influenza pandemic arises from one of the currently circulating pre-pandemic strains of Asian lineage HPAI A(H5N1), the mortality rates for the resulting human adapted pandemic strain cannot be predicted with any confidence.

== Existing pre-pandemic global case fatality ratio ==
The global case fatality ratio looks only to the official tally of cases confirmed by the WHO. It takes no account of other cases, such as those appearing in press reports. Nor does it reflect any estimate of the global extent of mild, asymptomatic, or other cases which are undiagnosed, unreported by national governments to the WHO, or for any reason cannot be confirmed by the WHO. While the WHO's case count is clearly the most authoritative, these unavoidable limitations result in an unknown number of cases being omitted from it. The problem of overlooked but genuine cases is emphasized by occasional reports in which later serology reveals antibodies to the H5N1 infection in the blood of persons who were never known to have bird flu, and who then are confirmed by the WHO only retroactively as "cases." Press reports of such cases, often poultry handlers, have appeared in various countries. The largest number of asymptomatic cases was confirmed in 2006 among Korean workers who had assisted in massive culls of H5N1-infected poultry. This relatively benign Korean strain of H5N1 has died out, and the remaining strains of H5N1 have a higher case fatality rate in humans.

Unconfirmed cases have a potentially huge impact on the case fatality ratio. This mathematical impact is well understood by epidemiologists, and is easy to see in theory. For example, if for each confirmed case reported by the WHO we assume that there has been another mild and unreported case, the actual global number of cases would be double the current number of WHO-confirmed cases. The fatality ratio for H5N1 infections would then be calculated as the same number of deaths, but divided by a doubled number for total cases, resulting in a hypothetical death ratio of half the currently reported fatality ratio. Such a result would indicate to epidemiologists that the world was confronting an H5N1 virus that is less-lethal than currently assumed, although possibly one that was more contagious and difficult to track.

A case-fatality ratio based on an accurate and all-inclusive count of cases would be invaluable, but unfortunately it is impossible to attain. The ability to diagnose every case of H5N1 as it arises does not exist. A few small reported studies have attempted to gather preliminary data on this crucial statistic, by carrying out systematic blood testing of neighbors and contacts of fatal cases in villages where there had been confirmed H5N1 fatalities. In most cases, this testing failed to turn up any overlooked mild cases, though in at least one study mild overlooked cases were identified. These methodical studies of contacts provide significant evidence that the high death rate among confirmed cases in the villages where these studies were carried out cannot be simply attributed to a wholesale failure to detect mild cases. Unfortunately, these studies are likely to remain too few and sketchy to define the complex situation worldwide regarding the lethality of the varying H5N1 clades. The testing and reporting necessary for mass serology studies to determine the incidence of overlooked cases for each existing clade and strain of H5N1 worldwide would be prohibitively costly.

The precise allocation of infections by the various H5N1 clades across the spectrum, including lethal, serious, mild, and asymptomatic cases, is likely to remain unknown in both humans and the hundreds of other species it can infect. Scientists are concerned about what we do know about H5N1 and about the vast amount of important data that we don't know about H5N1 and its future mutations.

== Demographic characteristics ==
Review of patient ages and outcomes reveals that H5N1 attacks are especially lethal in pre-adults and young adults, while older victims tend to have milder attacks and to survive. This is consistent with the frequent development of a cytokine storm in the affected. Few persons over 50 years of age seem to have become infected by H5N1, and very few have died following an H5N1 attack. Instead, the age-fatality curve of H5N1 influenza attacks in humans resembles that of the 1918 Spanish pandemic flu, and is the opposite of the mortality curve of seasonal flu strains, since seasonal influenza preferentially kills the elderly and does not kill by cytokine storm. An additional factor which may be active is that H1N1 was the predominant human flu circulating from 1918 until 1957 when the H2N2 strain emerged. Hence those over 50 years old have had the opportunity to be exposed to H1N1, and to develop some immune response to the N1 group contained in that human form of flu. Likewise, annual flu vaccination includes inoculation against a type-A human H1N1 flu, leading to the possibility that the annual flu shot or Flumist inoculation might confer some immunity against H5N1 bird flu infection, and indeed testing the blood of volunteers to look for immune response to H5N1 found that some blood samples showed immunity, but more of the blood samples of persons who had received the flu shot showed an immune response.

Another factor complicating any attempt to predict lethality of an eventual pandemic strain is the variability of the resistance of human victims to the pathogen. Many people with the current H5N1 influenza have been blood relatives (but rarely spouses) of other victims. Though this observation seemed to suggest that a familial genetic susceptibility might have played a role in human infection, a study by researchers at the Harvard School of public health noted no significant familial pattern of infection. Clearly, those whose immune systems are best able to fight off the virus are the most likely to survive a pandemic. Those with impairment of the needed immune function, whether from familial genetics or from AIDS, have poorer chances. Moreover, the health care system is generally expected to be overwhelmed throughout a pandemic. Persons needing access to medical care, whether for influenza or for unrelated serious maladies, are unlikely to receive the accustomed care, and without it their survival chances will be reduced.

== Predicting pandemic mortality rate ==
Although the actual rate of mortality during a pandemic is unknowable in advance, it is pressing to predict the possible ranges for that lethality responsibly in advance. The pre-pandemic case fatality ratio of over 50% provides a grim backdrop for the fact that the currently circulating H5N1 strains have certain genetic similarities with the Spanish Influenza pandemic virus. In that pandemic, 50 million to 100 million people worldwide were killed during about a year in 1918 and 1919. The highly lethal second and third waves of the 1918 Spanish flu evolved through time into a less virulent and more transmissible human form. Although the overall fatality rate for the Spanish flu is estimated to have been 10% to 20% of the population, the lethal waves of the Spanish flu are not reported to have emerged with anything like the over-50% case fatality ratio observed to date in human H5N1 infection. Studies indicating that an H5N1 pandemic may be more pathogenic than was the Spanish flu include a mouse study in which the H5N1 virus elicited significantly higher levels of pro-inflammatory cytokines in the lungs.

A human H5N1 pandemic might emerge with initial lethality resembling that over-50% case fatality now observed in pre-pandemic H5N1 human cases, rather than with the still-high 1-2% seen with the Spanish flu or with the lower rates seen in the two more recent influenza pandemics. As a WHO working group noted,

Determinants of virulence and transmissibility.

... One especially important question is whether the H5N1 virus is likely to retain its present high lethality should it acquire an ability to spread easily from person to person, and thus start a pandemic. Should the virus improve its transmissibility by acquiring, through a reassortment event, internal human genes, then the lethality of the virus would most likely be reduced. However, should the virus improve its transmissibility through adaptation as a wholly avian virus, then the present high lethality could be maintained during a pandemic.

The U.S. CDC presents a similarly sobering conclusion authored by Robert G. Webster et al.:

... We cannot afford simply to hope that human-to-human spread of H5N1 will not happen and that, if it does, the pathogenicity of the virus will attenuate. Notably, the precursor of the severe acute respiratory syndrome (SARS)–associated coronavirus (31) repeatedly crossed species barriers, probably for many years, before it finally acquired the capacity for human-to-human transmission, and its pathogenicity to humans was not attenuated. We cannot wait and allow nature to take its course. SARS was interrupted by early case detection and isolation, but influenza is transmissible early in the course of the disease and cannot be controlled by similar means.

Although some mammalian adaptations have been noted, H5N1 remains better adapted for infecting birds than mammalian hosts, which is why the disease it causes is called a bird flu. No pandemic strain of H5N1 has yet been found. The precise nature and extent of the genetic alterations that might change one of the currently circulating avian influenza strains into a human flu strain cannot be known in advance.

While many of the current H5N1 strains circulating in birds can generate a dangerous cytokine storm in healthy adult humans, the ultimate pandemic strain might arise from a less-lethal strain, or its current level of lethality might be lost in the adaptation to a human host.

If H5N1 mutates so that it can jump from human to human, while maintaining a relatively high level of mortality, how many people could die? Risk communication analysts Peter M. Sandman and Jody Lanard give a round-up of the various estimates:

Worldwide mortality estimates range all the way from 2-7.4 million deaths (the "conservatively low" pandemic influenza calculation of a flu modeling expert at the U.S. Centers for Disease Control and Prevention) to 1000 million deaths (the bird flu pandemic prediction of one Russian virologist). The estimates of most H5N1 experts range less widely but still widely. In an H5N1 pandemic, the experts guess that somewhere between a quarter of us and half of us would get sick, and somewhere between one percent and five percent of those who got sick would die — the young and hale as well as the old and frail. If it's a quarter and one percent, that's 16 million dead; if it's a half and five percent, it's 160 million dead. Either way it's a big number.

The renowned virus expert Robert G. Webster provided perhaps the most extreme estimate when he acknowledged in March 2006 that H5N1 has the theoretical capacity to mutate into a form that could kill one half of the human population, stating, "Society just can't accept the idea that 50 percent of the population could die. And I think we have to face that possibility".

=== Genetic factors ===
H5N1 may cause more than one influenza pandemic as it is expected to continue mutating in birds regardless of whether humans develop herd immunity to a future pandemic strain. Influenza pandemics from its genetic offspring may include influenza A virus subtypes other than H5N1. While genetic analysis of the H5N1 virus shows that influenza pandemics from its genetic offspring can easily be far more lethal than the Spanish flu pandemic, planning for a future influenza pandemic is based on what can be done and there is no higher Pandemic Severity Index level than a Category 5 pandemic which, roughly speaking, is any pandemic as bad the Spanish flu or worse; and for which all intervention measures are to be used.

There "is evidence of at least three independent virulence factors connected with three different genes. It is highly unlikely that all of the high-virulence alleles will simultaneously mutate and disappear if and when the haemagglutinin gene changes so as to make the haemagglutinin molecule better adapted for the human-type (alpha-2,6-linked) receptor (which is a necessary prerequisite in order that a pandemic with H5N1 virus may start). It is more probable that evolutionary adaptation of the haemagglutinin of H5N1 viruses to the human-type receptor will happen without any simultaneous change in those other genetic properties that now are important for explaining the exceptionally high virulence of certain strains of avian-adapted H5N1 influenza virus. The change of the haemagglutinin molecule from avian adaptation to human adaptation must be expected to act as an additional virulence factor because it will enhance the total number of cells that can be infected (per host organism), increase the total rate of virus replication and potentiate the effects of the other virulence factors already present." The H5N1 genes work together in ways we don't yet understand. Influenza research is continuing. The genetic factors that make H5N1 so deadly are only partly understood. Known factors involve the surface antigen encoding gene segments H (hemagglutinin) and N (neuraminidase) genes (causing it to be H5N1 for example), as well as the matrix M2 gene, and the polymerase genes.

"In order to cause a pandemic, H5N1 viruses will have to acquire the ability to transmit efficiently from person to person. The H5 hemagglutinin (HA) is found in influenza viruses that typically infect avian species, so efficient person-to-person spread could happen if the H5N1 virus reassorts, or exchanges genes, with circulating human influenza viruses giving rise to a virus with the H5 HA (to which the population is not immune) in a gene constellation that confers the property of transmissibility. Alternatively, efficient person-to-person spread could occur if the H5N1 virus evolves and adapts to more efficient replication and transmissibility in the human population."

A change of just two genes identified in laboratory testing appears to substantially increase the affinity of H5N1 for binding with human cell surface receptors.

Neuraminidase is an antigenic glycoprotein enzyme found on the surface of the influenza viruses. It helps the release of progeny viruses from infected cells. Flu drugs Tamiflu and Relenza work by inhibiting some strains of neuraminidase. They were developed based on N2 and N9. "In the N1 form of the protein, a small segment called the 150-loop is inverted, creating a hollow pocket that does not exist in the N2 and N9 proteins. [...] When the researchers looked at how existing drugs interacted with the N1 protein, they found that, in the presence of neuraminidase inhibitors, the loop changed its conformation to one similar to that in the N2 and N9 proteins."

The amino acid substitution (Ser31Asn) in the M2 gene in some H5N1 genotypes is associated with amantadine resistance which increases lethality. However the pathogenicity of H5N1/97 was related to the nonstructural (NS) gene. NS codes for two nonstructural proteins (NS1 and NEP). The NS1 gene of the highly pathogenic avian H5N1 viruses circulating in poultry and waterfowl in Southeast Asia is believed to be responsible for an enhanced proinflammatory cytokine response (especially TNFa) induced by these viruses in human macrophages. H5N1 NS1 is characterized by a single amino acid change at position 92. By changing the amino acid from glutamic acid to aspartic acid, researchers were able to abrogate the effect of the H5N1 NS1. This single amino acid change in the NS1 gene greatly increased the pathogenicity of the H5N1 influenza virus. This is one genetic factor in why H5N1 is so deadly.

Polymerase encoding gene segments are also implicated in why H5N1 is so deadly. PA genes code for the PA protein, which is a critical component of the viral polymerase. The PB1 gene codes for the PB1 protein and the PB1-F2 protein. The PB1-F2 protein probably contributes to viral pathogenicity and might have an important role in determining the severity of pandemic influenza. Until H5N1, all known avian influenza viruses had a Glu at position 627, while all human influenza viruses had a lysine. Recently, some 75% of H5N1 human virus isolates identified in Vietnam had a mutation consisting of Lysine at residue 627 in the PB2 protein; a change believed associated with high levels of virulence.

=== Areas of research ===
Areas of research to identify the likelihood of rapid or slow evolution to human contagion, or for predicting the greater or lesser likelihood of a rather lethal human-adapted influenza include:

- bird species susceptibility
- bird migration paths
- cell-based vaccine development
- adjuvant testing
- human vaccine clinical trials
- bird vaccine testing and use
- computer simulations of pandemic spread patterns (e.g. will grounding flights help?)
- detailed shape and gene code analysis of each of the RNA strands for as many flu virus strains as possible and making them available on a database for study
- wild bird testing for flu viruses
- testing humans for asymptomatic H5N1 infection
- training exercises in case of a pandemic

Computer simulations and direct gene manipulation have yielded inconclusive results.

=== Scientific advances ===
Scientific advances may attenuate probable lethality. The genetic lethality potential of the initial flu pandemic strain is only one important factor in determining the ultimate outcome in number of human lives lost. Another factor that grows potentially more important with the passage of time is human preparation. For example, no influenza vaccine specific to H5N1 could be produced when it emerged in Hong Kong in 1997, because it was lethal to eggs. Reverse DNA techniques have since made a vaccine possible, and several H5N1 vaccines have been tested and are in production in at least limited quantities. Vaccine development and production facilities are being ramped up, and possible pre-pandemic vaccines are being produced and studied. If a human pandemic does not emerge in the next few years, its eventual emergence may become almost a non-event if a very-effective pre-pandemic vaccine has prepared the population with sufficient herd immunity to blunt its lethality. Indeed, if there is sufficient immunity to stop it at the source, it will not become pandemic.

As long as the likelihood of protecting the population continues to rise with the passage of time, that likelihood becomes an increasingly important factor in predicting the loss of lives and the amount of economic dislocation that will ultimately occur. In light of human potential to develop herd immunity via vaccination in advance of a pandemic strain, the time that it allows us to do so before it evolves may become as crucial or more crucial to the measure of damage it causes than its own lethality and contagiousness.

Among the more attractive alternatives available for reducing mortality is vaccine stockpiling and prepandemic vaccination. "Human H5N1 vaccines are currently available and can induce heterotypic immunity. WHO and governments should give urgent consideration to the use of these vaccines for the priming of individuals or communities who would be at greatest risk of infection if an H5N1 influenza pandemic were to emerge." Death associated with influenza A viruses "is usually mediated by superinfection with bacteria, mainly Streptococcus pneumoniae.", suggesting that lethality may be reduced by vaccination against pneumonia.

=== Preparation ===
Among others, the Secretary of the United States Department of Health and Human Services (HHS) has repeatedly pointed out the key role of preparation in reducing pandemic mortality, including as examples research in cell- and DNA-based vaccines, as well as stockpiling available vaccines and antivirals and increasing vaccine manufacturing capacity.

== Planning reports ==
Governments and other organizations at many levels and in many places have produced "planning" reports that, among other things, have offered speculation on the mortality rate of an eventual H5N1 pandemic. That speculation has varied widely. One such report stated that "over half a million Americans could die and over 2.3 million could be hospitalized if a moderately severe strain of a pandemic flu virus hits the U.S.". No one knew if "moderately severe" was an accurate guess or not. A report entitled A Killer Flu? projected that, with an assumed (guessed) contraction rate of just 25%, and with a severity rate as low as that of the two lowest severity flu pandemics of the 1900s, a modern influenza A pandemic would cause 180 thousand deaths in the US, while a pandemic equaling the 1918 Spanish flu in level of lethality would cause one million deaths in the US. Again, the report offered no evidence that an emerging H5N1 flu pandemic would be between these figures.

The current avian flu, in humans, is fatal in over 50% of confirmed cases. Yet early projections like those above have assumed that such a lethal avian strain would surely lose genes contributing to its lethality in humans as it made the adaptations necessary for ready transmission in the human population. This optimistic assumption cannot be relied on. As the WHO reported in November 2006, initial outbreaks of an H5N1 pandemic could rival the current lethality of over 50%. Further information necessary to make an accurate projection of initial lethality of an H5N1 pandemic does not exist, as no data was collected that could show the pre-pandemic virulence in any potential flu strain until after the last pandemic of the 20th Century. There is no basis for assuming that an H5N1 pandemic will emerge with only the far lower 1-2% lethality rate of the Spanish flu, once assumed to be a worst-case scenario. There exists no reliable prediction of the mortality rate of an H5N1 pandemic, and it would be irresponsible to confine planning to only optimistic assumptions out of step with the currently observed case fatality ratio.

Although marred by unrealistically low ranges of assumed mortality, the earlier planning reports nevertheless show convincingly that we are not prepared even for a pandemic as severe as the milder pandemics of the past century., let alone the much higher case fatality ratios seen more recently.
