= Transmission and infection of H5N1 =

Spread of an influenza virus

Cumulative Human Cases of and Deaths from H5N1 As of April 11, 2007
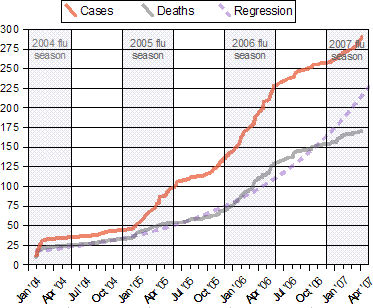
- Notes: Source WHO Confirmed Human Cases of H5N1; "[T]he incidence of human cases peaked, in each of the three years in which cases have occurred, during the period roughly corresponding to winter and spring in the northern hemisphere. If this pattern continues, an upsurge in cases could be anticipated starting in late 2006 or early 2007." Avian influenza – epidemiology of human H5N1 cases reported to WHO; The regression curve for deaths is y = a + e^{k x}, and is shown extended through the end of April, 2007.

Transmission and infection of H5N1 from infected avian sources to humans has been a concern since the first documented case of human infection in 1997, due to the global spread of H5N1 that constitutes a pandemic threat.

Infected birds pass on H5N1 through their saliva, nasal secretions, and feces. Other birds may pick up the virus through direct contact with these excretions or when they have contact with surfaces contaminated with this material. Because migratory birds are among the carriers of the H5N1 virus it may spread to all parts of the world. Past outbreaks of avian flu have often originated in crowded conditions in southeast and east Asia, where humans, pigs, and poultry live in close quarters. In these conditions a virus is more likely to mutate into a form that more easily infects humans. A few isolated cases of suspected human to human transmission exist, with the latest such case in June 2006 (among members of a family in Sumatra). No pandemic strain of H5N1 has yet been found.

H5N1 vaccines for chickens exist and are sometimes used, although there are many difficulties, and it's difficult to decide whether it helps more or hurts more. H5N1 pre-pandemic vaccines exist in quantities sufficient to inoculate a few million people and might be useful for priming to "boost the immune response to a different H5N1 vaccine tailor-made years later to thwart an emerging pandemic". H5N1 pandemic vaccines and technologies to rapidly create them are in the H5N1 clinical trials stage but can not be verified as useful until after there exists a pandemic strain.

== Environmental survival ==
Avian flu virus can last indefinitely at a temperature dozens of degrees below freezing, as is found in the northernmost areas that migratory birds frequent.

Heat kills H5N1 (i.e. inactivates the virus).

Influenza A viruses can survive:

- Over 30 days at 0 °C (32.0 °F) (over one month at freezing temperature)
- 6 days at 37 °C (98.6 °F) (one week at human body temperature)
- decades in permanently frozen lakes
- on hard non-porous surface such as plastic or stainless steel for 24–48 hours
- on clothes, paper and tissues for 8–12 hours

While cooking poultry to 70 °C (158 °F) kills the H5N1 virus, it is recommended to cook meat to 74 °C (165 °F) to kill all foodborne pathogens.

Inactivation of the virus also occurs under the following conditions:

- 30 minutes 60 °C (140.0 °F) (half-hour at a temperature that causes first and second degree burns in humans in ten seconds)
- Acidic pH conditions
- Presence of anti-microbial surfactants such as sodium dodecyl sulfate and lipid solvents
- Exposure to disinfectants: B-propiolactone, formalin, and iodine compounds

Ordinary levels of chlorine in tap water kill H5N1 in public water systems.

To kill avian flu viruses,

(the) World Health Organization recommends that environmental surfaces be cleaned by the following:

- Disinfectants such as sodium hypochlorite, 1% in-use dilution, 5% solution to be diluted 1:5 in clean water, for materials contaminated with blood and body fluids
- Bleaching powder seven grams per liter with 70% available chlorine for toilets and bathrooms
- 70% alcohol for smooth surfaces, tabletops, and other surfaces where bleach cannot be used

H5N1 "can remain infectious in municipal landfills for almost 2 years. [...] The two factors that most reduced influenza survival times were elevated temperature and acidic or alkaline pH."

== Avian flu in birds ==
According to Avian Influenza by Timm C. Harder and Ortrud Werner:

Following an incubation period of usually a few days (but rarely up to 21 days), depending upon the characteristics of the isolate, the dose of inoculum, the species, and age of the bird, the clinical presentation of avian influenza in birds is variable and symptoms are fairly unspecific. Therefore, a diagnosis solely based on the clinical presentation is impossible. The symptoms following infection with low pathogenic AIV may be as discrete as ruffled feathers, transient reductions in egg production or weight loss combined with a slight respiratory disease. Some LP strains such as certain Asian H9N2 lineages, adapted to efficient replication in poultry, may cause more prominent signs and also significant mortality. In its highly pathogenic form, the illness in chickens and turkeys is characterised by a sudden onset of severe symptoms and a mortality that can approach 100% within 48 hours.

The current method of prevention in animal populations is to destroy infected animals, as well as animals suspected of being infected. In southeast Asia, millions of domestic birds have been slaughtered to prevent the spread of the virus.

=== Poultry farming practices ===
There have been a number of farming practices that have changed in response to outbreaks of the H5N1 virus, including:

- vaccinating poultry against bird flu
- vaccinating poultry workers against human flu
- limiting travel in areas where H5N1 is found
- increasing farm hygiene
- reducing contact between livestock and wild birds
- reducing open-air wet markets
- limiting workers contact with cock fighting
- reducing purchases of live fowl
- improving veterinary vaccine availability and cost.

For example, after nearly two years of using mainly culling to control the virus, the Vietnamese government in 2005 adopted a combination of mass poultry vaccination, disinfecting, culling, information campaigns and bans on live poultry in cities.

=== Dealing with outbreaks ===
The majority of H5N1 flu cases have been reported in southeast and east Asia. Once an outbreak is detected, local authorities often order a mass slaughter of birds or animals infected or suspected to be infected.

=== Use of vaccines ===
Dr. Robert G. Webster et al. write

Transmission of highly pathogenic H5N1 from domestic poultry back to migratory waterfowl in western China has increased the geographic spread. The spread of H5N1 and its likely reintroduction to domestic poultry increase the need for good agricultural vaccines. In fact, the root cause of the continuing H5N1 pandemic threat may be the way the pathogenicity of H5N1 viruses is masked by cocirculating influenza viruses or bad agricultural vaccines."

Webster speculates that substandard vaccines may be preventing the expression of the disease in the birds but not stopping them from carrying or transmitting the virus through feces, or the virus from mutating.

In order to protect their poultry from death from H5N1, China reportedly made a vaccine based on reverse genetics produced with H5N1 antigens, that Dr Wendy Barclay, a virologist at the University of Reading believes have generated up to six variations of H5N1.

=== Transmission ===
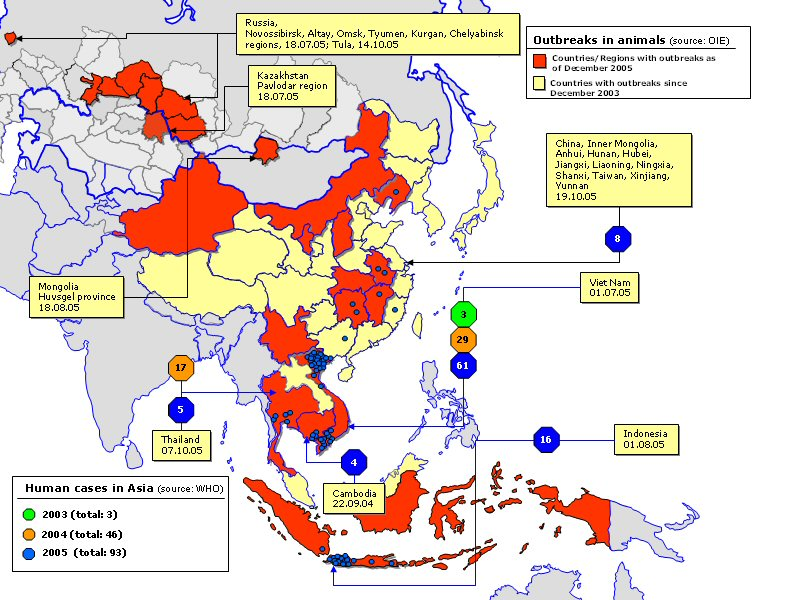
The spread of avian influenza in the eastern hemisphere.

According to the United Nations FAO, wild water fowl likely plays a role in the avian influenza cycle and could be the initial source for AI viruses, which may be passed on through contact with resident water fowl or domestic poultry, particularly domestic ducks. A newly mutated virus could circulate within the domestic and possibly resident bird populations until highly pathogenic avian influenza (HPAI) arises. This new virus is pathogenic to poultry and possibly to the wild birds that it arose from.

Wild birds found to have been infected with HPAI were either sick or dead. This could possibly affect the ability of these birds to carry HPAI for long distances. However, the findings in Qinghai Lake-China, suggest that H5N1 viruses could possibly be transmitted between migratory birds. Additionally, the new outbreaks of HPAI in poultry and wild birds in Russia, Kazakhstan, Western China and Mongolia may indicate that migratory birds probably act as carriers for the transport of HPAI over longer distances. Short-distance transmission between farms, villages or contaminated local water bodies is likewise a distinct possibility.

The AI virus has adapted to the environment in ways such as using water for survival and to spread, and creating a reservoir (ducks) strictly tied to water. The water in turn influences movement, social behavior and migration patterns of water bird species. It is therefore of great importance to know the ecological strategy of influenza virus as well, in order to fully understand this disease and to control outbreaks when they occur. Most research is needed concerning HPAI viruses in wild birds. For example, small birds like sparrows and starlings can be infected with deadly H5N1 strains and they can carry the virus from chicken house to chicken house causing massive epidemics among the chickens. However, pigeons do not present a risk as they neither catch nor carry the virus.

== Avian flu in humans ==
=== Human to human transmission ===
As of 2005, the WHO believed that another influenza pandemic is as likely to occur at any time since 1968, when the last century's third of three pandemics took place. The WHO describes a series of six phases, starting with the inter-pandemic period, where there are no new influenza virus subtypes detected in humans, and progressing numerically to the pandemic period, where there is efficient and sustained human-to-human transmission of the virus in the general population. According to WHO, the world has been at phase 3 on the scale, meaning a new influenza virus subtype is causing disease in humans, but has not yet spread efficiently and sustainably among humans.

So far, H5N1 infections in humans are attributed to bird-to-human transmission of the virus in most cases. Until May 2006, the WHO estimate of the number of human to human transmission had been "two or three cases". In May 2006, Julie L. Gerberding, director of the United States Centers for Disease Control and Prevention in Atlanta, estimated that there had been "at least three." Maria Cheng, a WHO spokeswoman, said there were "probably about half a dozen," but that no one "has got a solid number." A few isolated cases of suspected human to human transmission exist. with the latest such case in June 2006 (among members of a family in Sumatra). No pandemic strain of H5N1 has yet been found.

=== Prevention ===
Notwithstanding possible mutation of the virus, the probability of a "humanized" form of H5N1 emerging through genetic recombination in the body of a human co-infected with H5N1 and another influenza virus type (a process called reassortment) could be reduced by widespread seasonal influenza vaccination in the general population. It is not clear at this point whether vaccine production and immunization could be stepped up sufficiently to meet this demand.

If an outbreak of pandemic flu does occur, its spread might be slowed by increasing hygiene in aircraft, and by examining airline cabin air filters for presence of H5N1 virus.

The American Centers for Disease Control and Prevention advises travelers to areas of Asia where outbreaks of H5N1 have occurred to avoid poultry farms and animals in live food markets. Travelers should also avoid surfaces that appear to be contaminated by feces from any kind of animal, especially poultry.

There are several H5N1 vaccines for several of the avian H5N1 varieties. H5N1 continually mutates rendering them, so far for humans, of little use. While there can be some cross-protection against related flu strains, the best protection would be from a vaccine specifically produced for any future pandemic flu virus strain. Daniel R. Lucey, co-director of the Biohazardous Threats and Emerging Diseases graduate program at Georgetown University has made this point, "There is no H5N1 pandemic so there can be no pandemic vaccine." However, "pre-pandemic vaccines" have been created; are being refined and tested; and do have some promise both in furthering research and preparedness for the next pandemic. Vaccine manufacturing companies are being encouraged to increase capacity so that if a pandemic vaccine is needed, facilities will be available for rapid production of large amounts of a vaccine specific to a new pandemic strain.

It is not likely that use of antiviral drugs could prevent the evolution of a pandemic flu virus.

=== Symptoms ===
The human incubation period of avian influenza A (H5N1) is 2 to 17 days. Once infected, the virus can spread by cell-to-cell contact, bypassing receptors. So even if a strain is very hard to initially catch, once infected, it spreads rapidly within a body. For highly pathogenic H5N1 avian influenza in a human, "the time from the onset to presentation (median, 4 days) or to death (median, 9 to 10 days) has remained unchanged from 2003 through 2006."

Avian influenza HA preferentially binds to alpha-2,3 sialic acid receptors, while human influenza HA preferentially binds to alpha-2,6 sialic acid receptors. Usually other differences also exist. Currently, there is no human-adapted form of H5N1 influenza, so all humans who have caught it so far have caught avian H5N1.

Human flu symptoms usually include fever, cough, sore throat, muscle aches, conjunctivitis and, in severe cases, severe breathing problems and pneumonia that may be fatal. The severity of the infection will depend to a large part on the state of the infected person's immune system and if the victim has been exposed to the strain before, and is therefore partially immune. No one knows if these or other symptoms will be the symptoms of a humanized H5N1 flu.

Highly pathogenic H5N1 avian influenza in a human appears to be far worse, killing over 50% of humans reported infected with the virus, although it is unknown how many cases (with milder symptoms) go unreported. In one case, a boy with H5N1 experienced diarrhea followed rapidly by a coma without developing respiratory or flu-like symptoms.

As of February 2008, the "median age of patients with influenza A (H5N1) virus infection is approximately 18 years [...] The overall case fatality proportion is 61% [...] Handling of sick or dead poultry during the week before the onset of illness is the most commonly recognized risk factor [...] The primary pathologic process that causes death is fulminant viral pneumonia."

There have been studies of the levels of cytokines in humans infected by the H5N1 flu virus. Of particular concern is elevated levels of tumor necrosis factor-alpha (TNFα), a protein that is associated with tissue destruction at sites of infection and increased production of other cytokines. Flu virus-induced increases in the level of cytokines is also associated with flu symptoms including fever, chills, vomiting and headache. Tissue damage associated with pathogenic flu virus infection can ultimately result in death. The inflammatory cascade triggered by H5N1 has been called a 'cytokine storm' by some, because of what seems to be a positive feedback process of damage to the body resulting from immune system stimulation. H5N1 type flu virus induces higher levels of cytokines than the more common flu virus types such as H1N1. Other important mechanisms also exist "in the acquisition of virulence in avian influenza viruses" according to the CDC.

The NS1 protein of the highly pathogenic avian H5N1 viruses circulating in poultry and waterfowl in Southeast Asia is currently believed to be responsible for the enhanced proinflammatory cytokine response. H5N1 NS1 is characterized by a single amino acid change at position 92. By changing the amino acid from glutamic acid to aspartic acid, researchers were able to abrogate the effect of the H5N1 NS1. This single amino acid change in the NS1 gene greatly increased the pathogenicity of the H5N1 influenza virus.

In short, this one amino acid difference in the NS1 protein produced by the NS RNA molecule of the H5N1 virus is believed to be largely responsible for an increased pathogenicity (on top of the already increased pathogenicity of its hemagglutinin type which allows it to grow in organs other than lungs) that can manifest itself by causing a cytokine storm in a patient's body, often causing pneumonia and death.

=== Treatment ===
Neuraminidase inhibitors are a class of drugs that includes zanamivir and oseltamivir, the latter being licensed for prophylaxis treatment in the United Kingdom. Oseltamivir inhibits the influenza virus from spreading inside the user's body. It is marketed by Roche as Tamiflu. This drug has become a focus for some governments and organizations trying to be seen as making preparations for a possible H5N1 pandemic. In August 2005, Roche agreed to donate three million courses of Tamiflu to be deployed by the WHO to contain a pandemic in its region of origin. Although Tamiflu is patented, international law gives governments wide freedom to issue compulsory licenses for life-saving drugs.

A second class of drugs, which include amantadine and rimantadine, target the M2 protein, but have become ineffective against most strains of H5N1, due to their use in poultry in China in the 1990s, which created resistant strains. However, recent data suggest that some strains of H5N1 are susceptible to the older drugs, which are inexpensive and widely available.

Research indicates that therapy to block one cytokine to lessen a cytokine storm in a patient may not be clinically beneficial.

=== Mortality rate ===
Human Mortality from H5N1 As of April 11, 2007
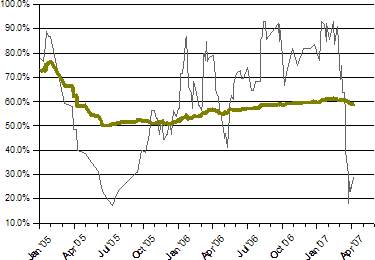
- Source: WHO Confirmed Human Cases of H5N1: The thin line represents average mortality of recent cases. The thicker line represents mortality averaged over all cases.; According to WHO: "Assessment of mortality rates and the time intervals between symptom onset and hospitalization and between symptom onset and death suggests that the illness pattern has not changed substantially during the three years."

Between 2003 and December 2025, the World Health Organization has recorded 993 cases of confirmed H5N1 influenza, leading to 477 deaths. The true fatality rate is presumably lower because cases with mild symptoms may not have been identified as H5N1.

== See also ==
- Fujian flu
- Severe acute respiratory syndrome
