= Nasal vaccine =

Vaccine administered via the nose

A nasal vaccine is a vaccine administered through the nose that stimulates an immune response without an injection. It induces immunity through the inner surface of the nose, a surface that naturally comes in contact with many airborne microbes. Nasal vaccines are emerging as an alternative to injectable vaccines because they do not use needles and can be introduced through the mucosal route. Nasal vaccines can be delivered through nasal sprays to prevent respiratory infections, such as influenza.

== History ==
Nasal inoculation dates as far back as the 17th century in China during the Kangxi Emperor's reign. Documentation during this period indicates that the Kangxi Emperor vaccinated his family, army, and others for mild smallpox. Manuals detailing vaccination techniques at the time all focused on sending smallpox up the nose of the individual being vaccinated. Although other vaccination techniques were developed using an infected individual's scabs, a common method was to place a cotton swab with the fluid from an infected person's pustule up the nose.

Following smallpox, influenza became a prominent focus for nasal vaccine development. The first live attenuated influenza vaccine (LAIV) in the form of a nasal spray was created in Russia by the Institute of Experimental Medicine in 1987. This nasal vaccine development was based on the Russian backbone of LAIV while nasal vaccines since then have been based on other LAIV backbones. The first nasal influenza vaccine was released in the United States in 2001 but was taken off the market due to toxicity concerns. FluMist, one of the most prominent nasal LAIVs, was released in 2003 as nasal LAIVs continued developing.

Nasal vaccine
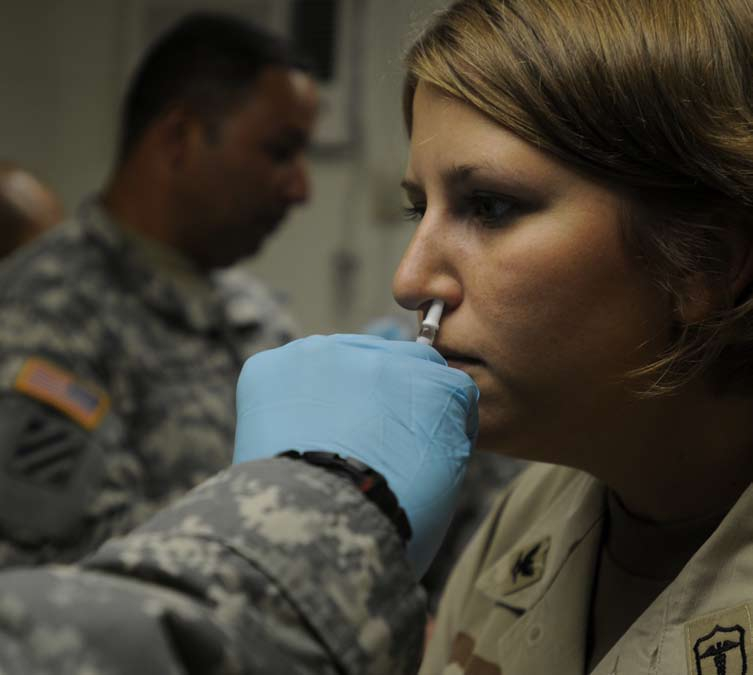
- Application of an intranasal mist of the flu vaccine
- Specialty: Vaccine delivery

Anthrax attacks at the beginning of the 21st century caused a demand for nasal vaccine development. As anthrax is an airborne substance that can be inhaled, a nasal vaccine has the potential to be used to protect individuals from the effects it can have on the respiratory system. Following the September 11, 2001 terrorist attacks in the United States, several individuals at news stations and U.S. senators died after being sent letters with anthrax as an act of bioterrorism. Nasal vaccine research and development against anthrax was encouraged by the U.S. government in an effort to vaccinate troops. BioThrax, the current anthrax vaccine that is licensed and administered in the United States, requires up to five intramuscular injections and annual boosters; research within the past decade has developed an alternative nasal vaccine that follows the path of infection for anthrax and induces both humoral and cellular immune responses.

The global COVID-19 pandemic led to a rise in nasal vaccines against coronavirus. International efforts for vaccine development occurred as countries such as India, Iran, Russia, and China created nasal COVID-19 vaccines.

== Administration ==
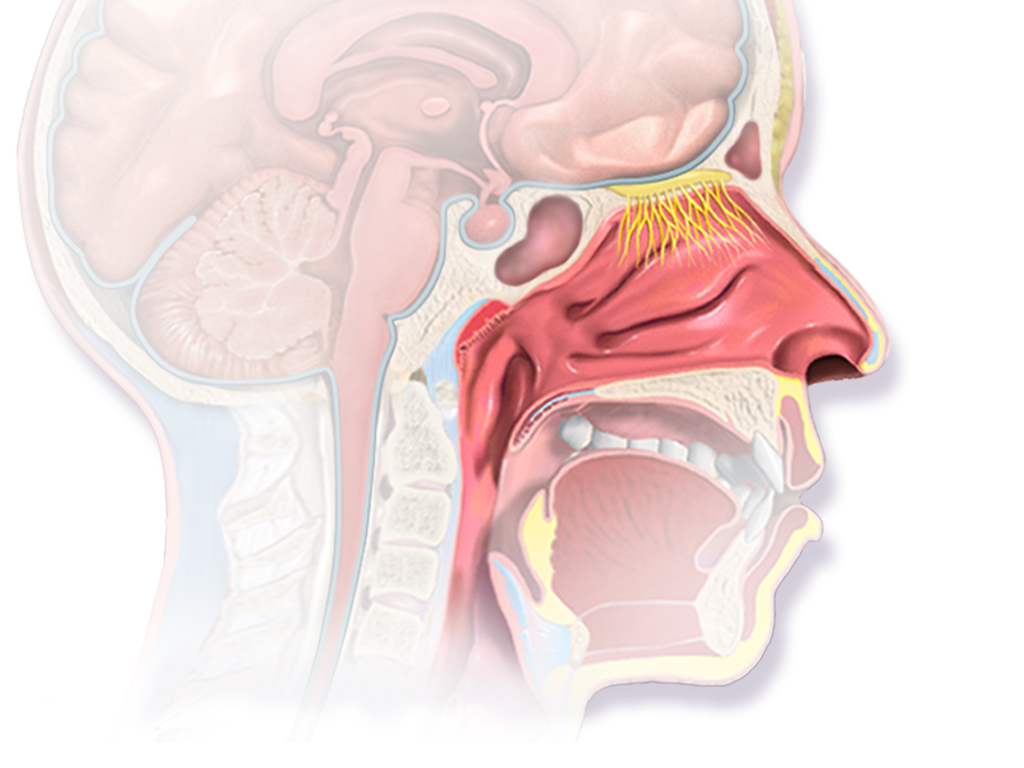
Human nasal anatomy

Nasal vaccines are a subsection of mucosal immunization as they use a mucosal route for vaccine delivery. As many pathogens can enter the body through the nose, nasal vaccines take advantage of this mechanism to deliver the vaccine. The nose has multiple lines of defense to prevent pathogens from entering further into the body. Nasal hairs are the first defense as they are at the entrance of the nose and prevent large particles from entering. The mucus layer in the nasal cavity can trap smaller particles that get past the nose hairs. The nasal cavity has a large vascularization network, allowing particles to go through the epithelial layer and directly enter the bloodstream. Intruding particles will interact with the mucosal immune system if they reach the nasal mucosa. The mucosal immune system is composed of lymphoid tissue, B cells, T cells, and antigen-presenting cells. These different types of cells work together to identify intruding particles and trigger an immune response. Nasal vaccines must overcome these barriers and get clearance to deliver the viral antigen to patients.

Nasal vaccines can come in different forms such as solutions (liquids), powders, gels, and solid inserts. The most prevalent type of nasal vaccine in research and clinical application is solutions due to its ease of use. Although solutions are usually pipetted into test subjects' nostrils when conducting animal trials for nasal vaccines, nasal sprays are considered the most practical approach for mass human vaccination using nasal vaccines. A nasal spray is able to bypass the initial layers of the nasal mucosa and deliver the vaccine particles directly to the mucoadhesive layer. The antigen in the nasal vaccine can then trigger an immune response and prevent infection due to nasal vaccines' accessibility to the immune system.

Nasal sprays are commonly used for delivering drugs in addition to vaccines. Decongestant drugs are often directly delivered to the nose through nasal sprays. Cold and allergy medication can be administered using nasal sprays for local delivery by bypassing nasal hairs and being introduced to the nasal cavity. Intranasal administration can have less drug degradation compared to oral administration because of direct particle delivery. Peptide drugs used for hormone treatments can be delivered nasally through nasal sprays instead of orally to retain particle integrity. Nasal sprays can also be used to deliver diabetes treatment, steroids, and intranasal oxytocin to induce labor. Nasal administration is also used to deliver anesthetics and sedatives due to direct access to the mucosal immune system and bloodstream.

The olfactory epithelium makes up approximately 7% of the surface area of the nasal cavity and is connected to the olfactory bulb in the brain. Drugs and vaccines can be delivered to the brain past the blood-brain barrier through olfactory nerve cells.

Compared to injectable vaccines, nasal vaccines can be advantageous because they are safe, painless, and easy to use, possibly allowing self-administration. Nasal vaccines do not require a needle, which eliminates pain from needlestick injuries and safety concerns due to cross-contamination and needle disposal. Some studies also show that intranasal vaccines can generate cross-reactive antibodies that could lead to cross-protection.

== Live attenuated influenza vaccine ==
The live attenuated influenza vaccine (LAIV) in the form of a nasal spray was one of the first nasal vaccines released on the market. Nasal spray LAIVs have been used since the late 1980s as an alternative to the injectable influenza vaccine. Nasal influenza vaccines have become popular as they reduce the risk of intramuscular injuries from administration and are painless. They can also be given more easily to patients because they do not require a needle.

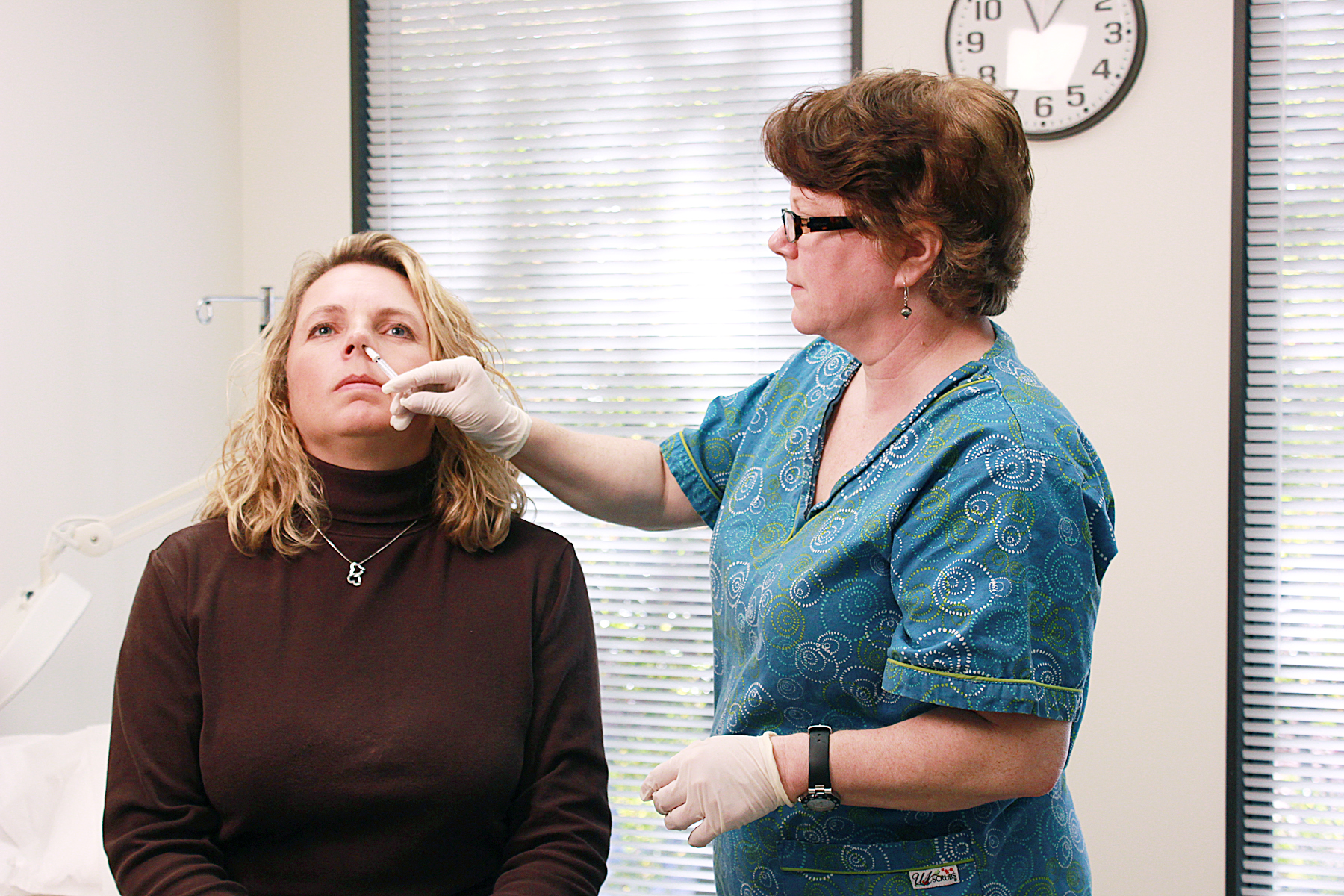
FluMist Quadrivalent

The most prominent nasal LAIV is FluMist, which was released in 2003. FluMist, officially known as FluMist Quadrivalent in the United States and Fluenz in Europe, is known to be the only flu vaccine on the market that does not use a needle. All nasal LAIVs for recent flu seasons (2022-2023) are considered quadrivalents because "they are designed to protect against four types of flu viruses: an influenza A(H1N1) virus, an influenza A(H3N2) virus and two influenza B viruses." Although injectable and nasal LAIVs are presented as options for yearly vaccination against influenza, FluMist was pulled off of the United States market from 2016 to 2018 due to its inefficiency against a common influenza strain in children. Since then, FluMist has been reformulated and has re-entered the market.

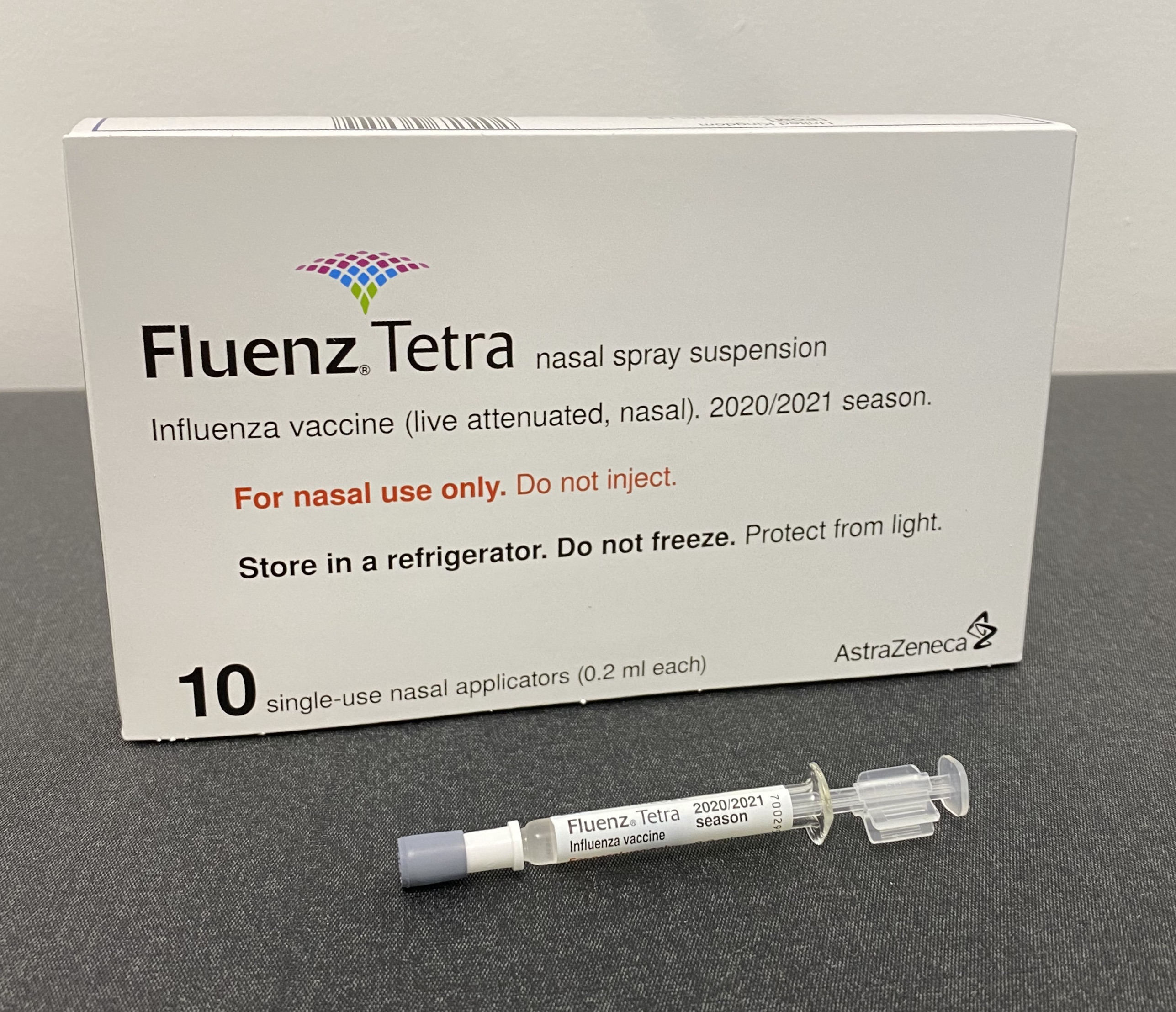
Fluenz Tetra

The active ingredients in nasal LAIVs are grown in fertilized chicken eggs. The practice of growing viruses in chicken eggs is common in vaccine production because these viruses need to be grown inside cells. Virus fluid from the incubated chicken eggs is extracted and killed for the viral antigen to be purified for LAIV production. Similar to other vaccines, nasal LAIVs contain ingredients in addition to the viral antigen. Stabilizers such as gelatine, arginine hydrochloride, monosodium glutamate, and sucrose are commonly used in vaccines to assure the vaccines are still effective during and after production, transportation, and storage as well as delivery. Stabilizers are especially important for nasal vaccines as proteases and amino-peptidase in the mucosal membrane can degrade proteins and peptides in vaccines. Research continues to improve nasal LAIVs as influenza affects nearly 9 million people. As influenza changes slightly each year, continuous research on new strains can improve vaccine efficiency. Research on nasal vaccine development for nontypeable Haemophilus influenzae shows that the vaccine binding to surface proteins prevented biofilm formation. As a result, this vaccine can have the potential to treat ear infections caused by biofilm from influenza infection. New components like α-galactosylceramide (α-GalCer) are also being researched to be used as nasal vaccines against influenza. Since α-GalCer induced immune responses when immunized with a replication-deficient live adenovirus, there is evidence that nasal LAIVs can be co-immunized with other treatments against influenza.

== Applications to veterinary medicine ==
Species other than humans use nasal vaccines to prevent diseases. Intranasal vaccines are used on dogs for Bordetella bronchiseptica to prevent infectious tracheobronchitis (ITB). ITB, commonly known as kennel cough, typically spreads in highly populated environments such as kennels and dog shelters. Consistent vaccination against ITB using an intranasal vaccine can create an immune response to protect the vaccinated dog.

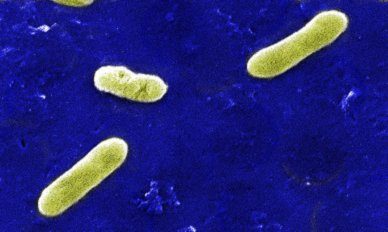
Bordetella Bronchiseptica

Cattle receive nasal vaccines against diseases such as bovine herpesvirus 1, parainfluenza type 3, and bovine rhinotracheitis virus. As all three of these viruses are related to respiratory infection, using an intranasal route can bring the vaccine directly to the respiratory system.

Recent discoveries indicate that rainbow trout have a previously unknown lymphoid structure in their nasal cavity. This structure allows them to have fast innate and adaptive responses to nasal vaccines.

== See also ==
- Nasal administration
- Mucosal immunology
