= INCOVACC =

Vaccine candidate against COVID-19

Vaccine description
- Target: SARS-CoV-2
- Vaccine type: Viral vector

Clinical data
- Trade names: iNCOVACC
- Routes of administration: Intranasal
- ATC code: None

Identifiers
- CAS Number: 2698317-00-7

iNCOVACC (codenamed BBV154) is an intranasal COVID-19 vaccine candidate developed by Bharat Biotech, American company Precision Virologics and the Washington University School of Medicine in St Louis, Missouri, United States.

== History ==
=== Clinical trials ===
==== Phase I trials ====
On recommendation by the Subject Expert Committee (SEC) under the Indian drug regulator, the company conducted phase 1 clinical trials using 75 volunteers and submit safety and immunogenicity data for the committee's consideration before it proceeds to the second phase of the trial.

==== Phase II and III trials ====
On 12 August 2021, after evaluating the results of phase I trial data, the drug regulator approved for phase II/III randomized trials that involves evaluation of the immunogenicity and safety of Covaxin with BBV154 in healthy volunteers.

=== Authorizations ===
==== India ====
On 24 December 2022, the Government of India approved the intranasal vaccine for inclusion in the vaccination programme as a booster dose for those above 18 years of age.
