= Nasal administration =

Administration of drugs through the nose

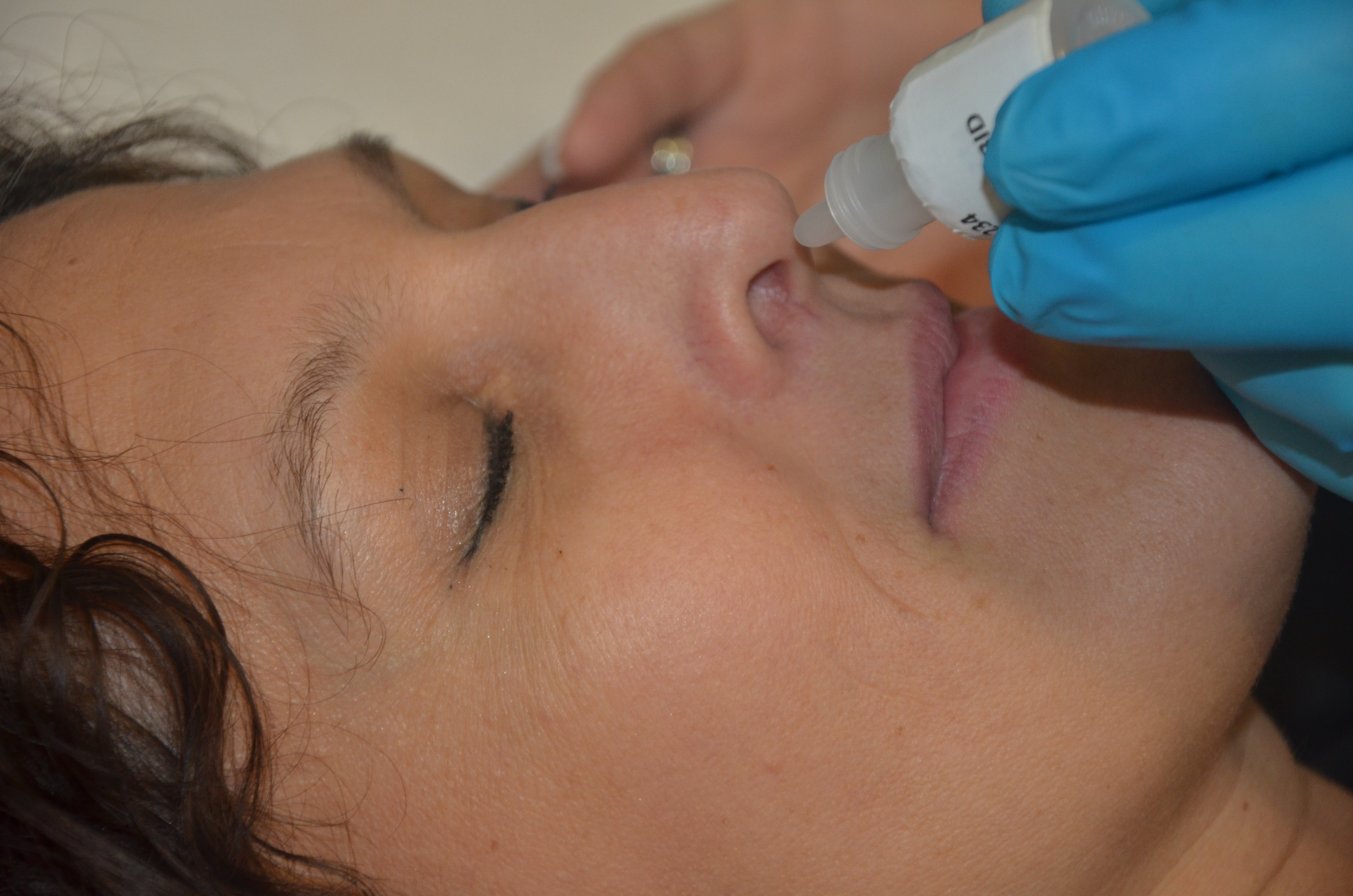
A medical professional applies nose drops.

Nasal administration, popularly known as snorting, is a route of administration in which drugs are insufflated through the nose. It can be a form of either topical administration or systemic administration, as the drugs thus locally delivered can go on to have either purely local or systemic effects. Nasal sprays are locally acting drugs, such as decongestants for cold and allergy treatment, whose systemic effects are usually minimal. Examples of systemically active drugs available as nasal sprays are migraine drugs, rescue medications for overdose and seizure emergencies, hormone treatments, nicotine nasal spray, and nasal vaccines such as live attenuated influenza vaccine.

== Risks ==
=== Nasal septum perforation ===
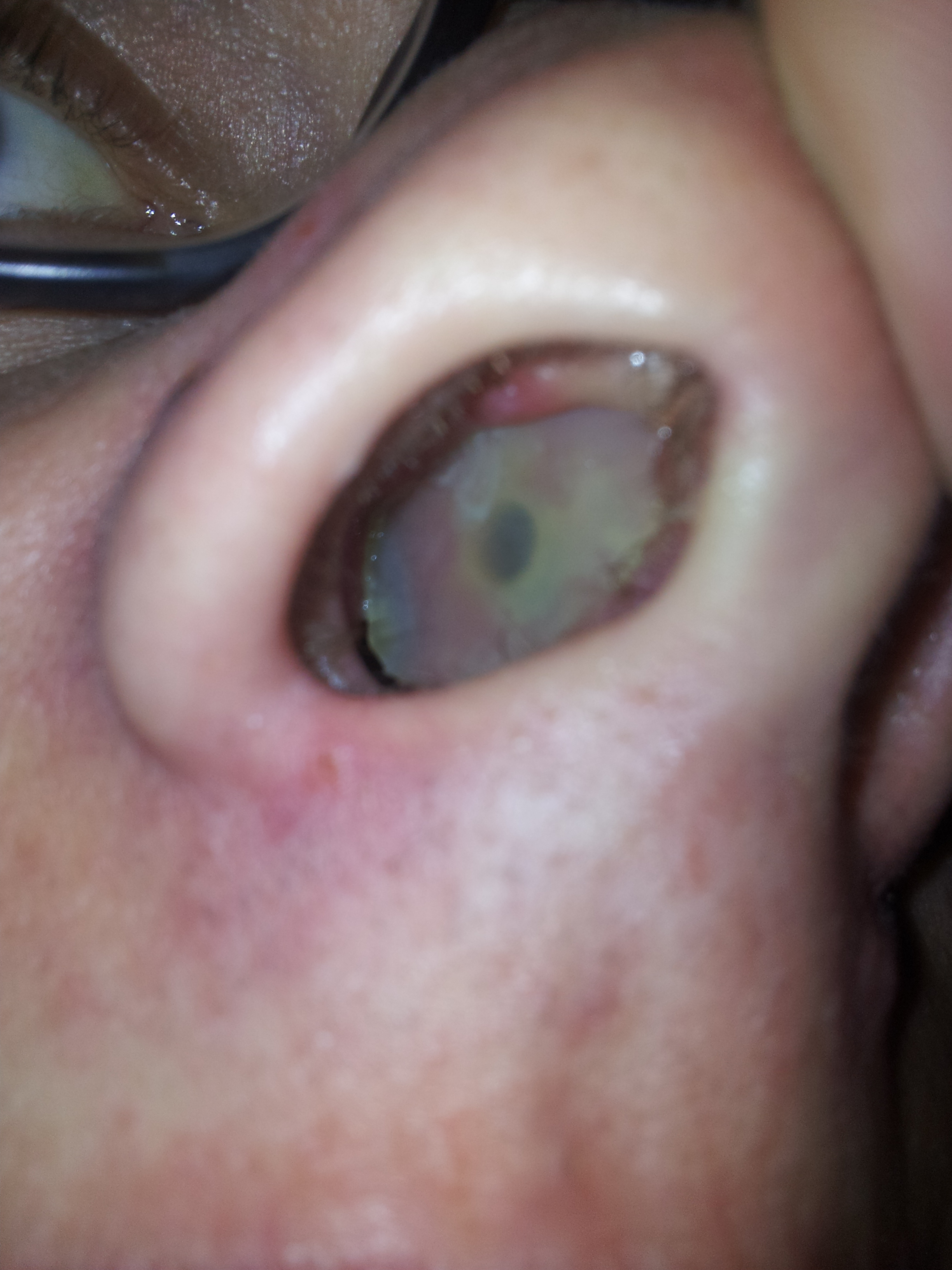
"Cocaine nose" refers to nasal septum perforation from cocaine use (pictured), or to cocaine-induced midline destructive lesions (CIMDL), which may develop as the damage progresses.

A nasal septum perforation is a medical condition in which the nasal septum, the bony/cartilaginous wall dividing the nasal cavities, develops a hole or fissure. Nasal administration may cause nasal septum perforation by gradually injuring and ulcerating the epithelium, causing cartilage exposure and necrosis.

=== Risk factors for shared drug paraphernalia ===
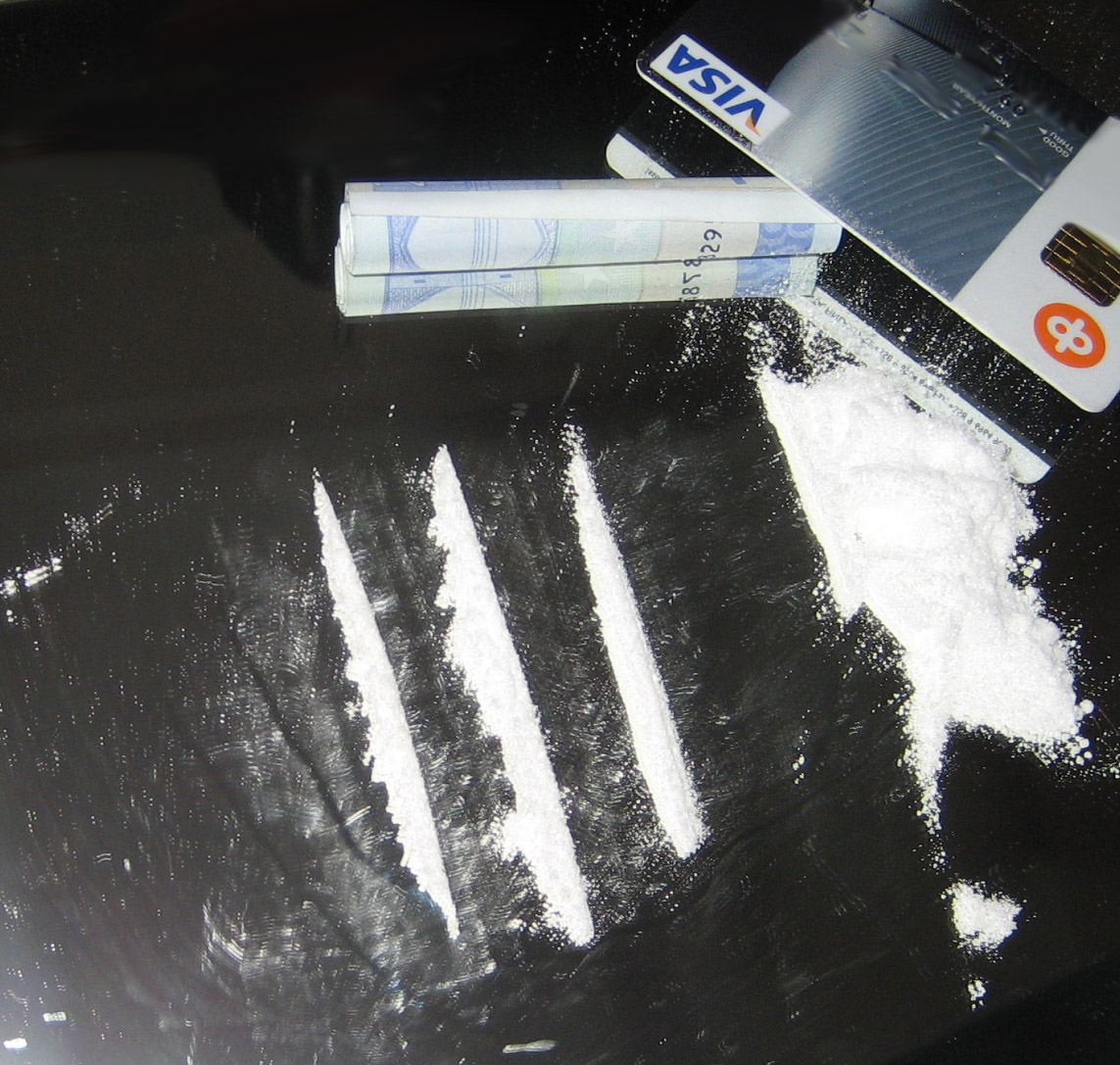
Lines of cocaine prepared for snorting. Contaminated currency such as banknotes might serve as a fomite of diseases like hepatitis C

Sharing snorting equipment (nasal spray bottles, straws, banknotes, bullets, etc.) has been linked to the transmission of hepatitis C. In one study, the University of Tennessee Medical Center researchers warned that other blood-borne diseases such as HIV could be transmitted as well.

== Advantages ==
The nasal cavity is covered by a thin mucosa which is well vascularised. Therefore, a drug molecule can be transferred quickly across the single epithelial cell layer directly to the systemic blood circulation without first-pass hepatic and intestinal metabolism. The effect is often reached within 5 minutes for smaller drug molecules. Nasal administration can therefore be used as an alternative to oral administration, by crushing or grinding tablets or capsules and snorting or sniffing the resulting powder, providing a rapid onset of effects if a fast effect is desired or if the drug is extensively degraded in the gut or liver.

Large-molecule drugs can also be delivered directly to the brain by the intranasal route, the only practical means of doing so, following the olfactory and trigeminal nerves (see section below), for widespread central distribution throughout the central nervous system with little exposure to the blood. This delivery method to the brain was functionally demonstrated in humans in 2006, using insulin, a large peptide hormone that acts as a nerve growth factor in the brain.

== Limitations ==
Nasal administration is primarily suitable for potent drugs since only a limited volume can be sprayed into the nasal cavity. Drugs for continuous and frequent administration may be less suitable because of the risk of harmful long-term effects on the nasal epithelium. Nasal administration has also been associated with a high variability in the amount of drug absorbed. Upper airway infections may increase the variability as may the extent of sensory irritation of the nasal mucosa, differences in the amount of liquid spray that is swallowed and not kept in the nasal cavity and differences in the spray actuation process. However, the variability in the amount absorbed after nasal administration should be comparable to that after oral administration.

== Nasal drugs ==
The area of intranasal medication delivery provides a huge opportunity for research – both for specifically developed pharmaceutical drugs designed for intranasal treatment, as well as for investigating off-label uses of commonly available generic medications. Steroids and a large number of inhalational anaesthetic agents are being used commonly. The recent developments in intranasal drug delivery systems are prodigious. Peptide drugs (hormone treatments) are also available as nasal sprays, in this case to avoid drug degradation after oral administration. The peptide analogue desmopressin is, for example, available for both nasal and oral administration, for the treatment of diabetes insipidus. The bioavailability of the commercial tablet is 0.1% while that of the nasal spray is 3-5% according to the SPC (Summary of Product Characteristics). Intranasal calcitonin, calcitonin-salmon, is used to treat hypercalcaemia arising out of malignancy, Paget's disease of bone, post menopausal and steroid induced osteoporosis, phantom limb pain and other metabolic bone abnormalities, available as Rockbone, Fortical and Miacalcin Nasal Spray. GnRH analogues like nafarelin and busurelin are used for the treatment of anovulatory infertility, hypogonadotropic hypogonadism, delayed puberty and cryptorchidism. Other potential drug candidates for nasal administration include anaesthetics, antihistamines (Azelastine), antiemetics (particularly metoclopramide and ondansetron) and sedatives that all benefit from a fast onset of effect. Intranasal midazolam is found to be highly effective in acute episodes of seizures in children. Recently, the upper part of the nasal cavity, as high as the cribriform plate, has been proposed for drug delivery to the brain. This "transcribrial route", published first in 2014, was suggested by the author for drugs to be given for Primary Meningoencephalitis.

=== Recreational drugs/entheogens ===
List of substances that have higher bioavailability when administered intranasally compared to oral administration.

==== Cocaine ====
Insufflation of cocaine leads to the longest duration of its effects (60–90 minutes). When insufflating cocaine, absorption through the nasal membranes is approximately 30–60%.

==== Ketamine ====
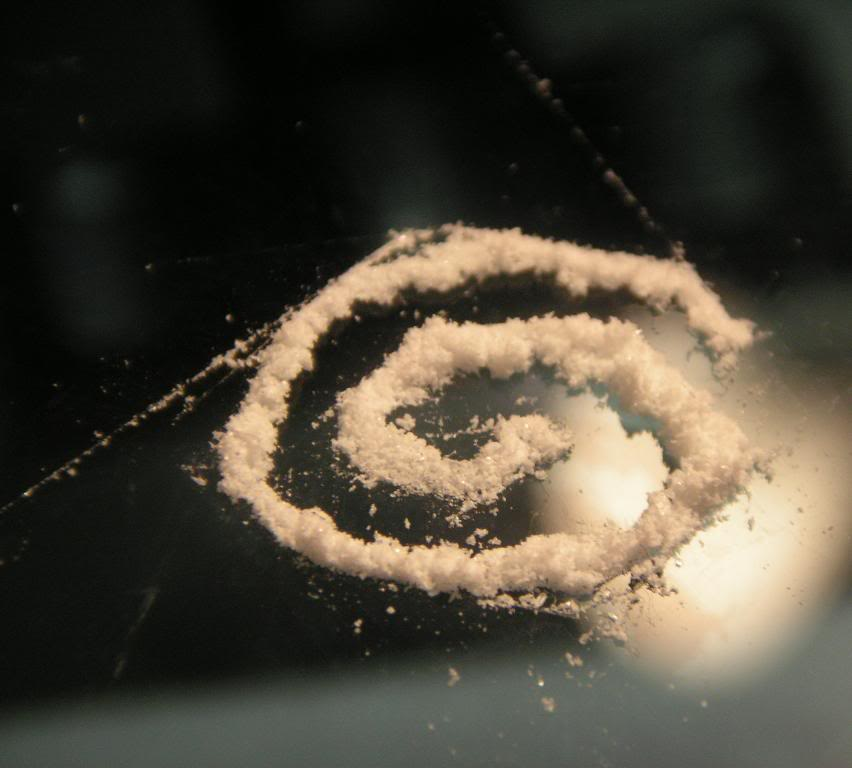
Ketamine prepared in a spiral for "snorting"

Among the less invasive routes for ketamine, the intranasal route has the highest bioavailability (45–50%).

==== Snuff ====
Snuff is a type of smokeless tobacco product made from finely ground or pulverized tobacco leaves. It is snorted or "sniffed" (alternatively sometimes written as "snuffed") into the nasal cavity, delivering nicotine and a flavored scent to the user (especially if flavoring has been blended with the tobacco). Traditionally, it is sniffed or inhaled lightly after a pinch of snuff is either placed onto the back surface of the hand, held pinched between thumb and index finger, or held by a specially made "snuffing" device.

==== Yopo ====
Snuff trays and tubes similar to those commonly used for yopo were found in the central Peruvian coast dating back to 1200 BC, suggesting that insufflation of Anadenanthera beans is a more recent method of use. Archaeological evidence of insufflation use within the period 500-1000 AD, in northern Chile, has been reported.

== Research ==
=== Olfactory transfer ===
There is about 20 mL capacity in the adult human nasal cavity. The major part of the approximately 150 cm^{2} surface in the human nasal cavity is covered by respiratory epithelium, across which systemic drug absorption can be achieved. The olfactory epithelium is situated in the upper posterior part and covers approximately 10 cm^{2} of the human nasal cavity. The nerve cells of the olfactory epithelium project into the olfactory bulb of the brain, which provides a direct connection between the brain and the external environment. The transfer of drugs to the brain from the blood circulation is normally hindered by the blood–brain barrier (BBB), which is virtually impermeable to passive diffusion of all but small, lipophilic substances. However, if drug substances can be transferred along the olfactory nerve cells, they can bypass the BBB and enter the brain directly.

The olfactory transfer of drugs into the brain is thought to occur by either slow transport inside the olfactory nerve cells to the olfactory bulb or by faster transfer along the perineural space surrounding the olfactory nerve cells into the cerebrospinal fluid surrounding the olfactory bulbs and the brain.

Olfactory transfer could theoretically be used to deliver drugs that have a required effect in the central nervous system such as those for Parkinson's or Alzheimer's diseases. Studies have been presented showing that direct transfer of drugs is achievable.

== See also ==
- Nose-to-brain drug delivery mechanism
