= H5N1 vaccine clinical trials =

Clinical trials of influenza vaccine

H5N1 clinical trials are clinical trials concerning H5N1 vaccines, which are intended to provide immunization to influenza A virus subtype H5N1. They are intended to discover pharmacological effects and identify any adverse reactions the vaccines may achieve in humans.

== Current status of H5N1 candidate vaccines ==
Candidate vaccines were developed in the United States and the United Kingdom during 2003 for protection against the strain that was isolated from humans in Hong Kong in February 2003 but the 2003 strain died out in 2004 making the vaccine of little use. In April 2004, WHO made an H5N1 prototype seed strain available to manufacturers. In August 2006, WHO changed the prototype strains and now offers three new prototype strains which represent three of the six subclades of the clade 2 virus which have been responsible for many of the human cases that have occurred since 2005.

The National Institute of Allergy and Infectious Diseases (NIAID) awarded H5N1 vaccine contracts to Aventis Pasteur (now Sanofi Pasteur) of Swiftwater, Pennsylvania, and to Chiron Corporation of Emeryville, California. Each manufacturer is using established techniques in which the virus is grown in eggs and then inactivated and further purified before being formulated into vaccines.

"A universal influenza vaccine could provide protection against all types of influenza and would eliminate the need to develop individual vaccines to specific H and N virus types. Such a vaccine would not need to be reengineered each year and could protect against an emergent pandemic strain. Developing a universal vaccine requires that researchers identify conserved regions of the influenza virus that do not exhibit antigenic variability by strain or over time. A universal vaccine, ACAM-FLU-A, is being developed by the British company Acambis and is being researched by others as well. Acambis (meanwhile also acquired by Sanofi Pasteur) announced in early August 2005 that it has had successful results in animal testing. The vaccine focuses on the M2 viral protein, which does not change, rather than the surface hemagglutinin and neuraminidase proteins targeted by traditional flu vaccines. The universal vaccine is made through bacterial fermentation technology, which would greatly speed up the rate of production over that possible with culture in chicken eggs, plus the vaccine could be produced constantly, since its formulation would not change. Still, such a vaccine is years away from full testing, approval, and use." As of July 2007, phase I clinical trials on humans are underway in which a vaccine that focuses on the M2 viral protein "is being administered to a small group of healthy people in order to verify the safety of the product and to provide an initial insight into the vaccine’s effect on the human immune system." (See also Universal flu vaccines) The current development state of ACAM-FLU-A is unclear.

In June 2006, the National Institutes of Health (NIH) began enrolling participants in a Phase 1 H5N1 study of an intranasal influenza vaccine candidate based on MedImmune's live, attenuated vaccine technology.

Oct 2010 Inovio starts a phase I clinical trial of its H5N1 vaccine (VGX-3400X).

Oct 2012 Novavax, Inc. pandemic influenza vaccine Phase I trials meet primary objectives.

=== Approved human H5N1 vaccines ===
On April 17, 2007 the US FDA approved "Influenza Virus Vaccine, H5N1" by manufacturer Sanofi Pasteur Inc for manufacture at its Swiftwater, PA facility.

In March 2006, Ferenc Gyurcsány, who was the prime minister of Hungary at the time, reported that Omninvest developed a vaccine to protect humans against the H5N1 influenza strain. The vaccine was approved by the country's national pharmaceutical institute for commercial production.

=== Results of trials ===
Early results from H5N1 clinical trials showed poor immunogenicity compared to the 15-mcg dose that induces immunity in a seasonal flu vaccine. Trials in 2006 and 2007 using two 30-mcg doses produced unacceptable results while a 2006 trial using two doses of 90 mcg each achieved acceptable levels of protection. Current flu vaccine manufacturing plants can not produce enough pandemic flu vaccine at this high dose level.

"Adjuvanted vaccines appear to hold the greatest promise for solving the grave supply-demand imbalance in pandemic influenza vaccine development. They come with obstacles—immunologic, regulatory, and commercial—but they also have generated more excitement than any other type of vaccine thus far. [In August 2007], scientists working with a GlaxoSmithKline formula published a trial of a two-dose regimen of an inactivated split-virus vaccine adjuvanted with a proprietary oil-in-water emulsion; after the second injection, even the lowest dose of 3.8 mcg exceeded EU criteria for immune response (see Bibliography: Leroux-Roels 2007). And in September, Sanofi Pasteur reported in a press release that an inactivated vaccine adjuvanted with the company's own proprietary formula induced EU-accepted levels of protection after two doses of 1.9 mcg."

The "GlaxoSmithKline-backed team that described an acceptable immune response after two adjuvanted 3.8-microgram (mcg) doses found that three fourths of their subjects were protected not only against the clade 1 Vietnam virus on which the vaccine was based, but against a drifted clade 2 virus from Indonesia as well [...] To achieve prepandemic vaccines, researchers would have to ascertain the right dose and dose interval, determine how long priming lasts, and solve the puzzle of measuring primed immunity. Further, regulatory authorities would have to determine the trial design that could deliver those answers, the public discussion that would be necessary for prepandemic vaccines to be accepted, and the safety data that would need to be gathered once the vaccines went into use".

== Individual studies ==
=== Revaccination - January 2006 ===
Study completion: January 2006

The purpose of this study is to determine whether having received an H5 vaccine in the past primes the immune system to respond rapidly to another dose of H5 vaccine. Subjects who participate in this study will have participated in a previous vaccine study (involving the A/Hong/Kong/97 virus) during the fall of 1998 at the University of Rochester.

=== A/H5N1 in adult - February 2006 ===
Study start: April 2005; Study completion: February 2006

The purpose of this study is to determine the dose-related safety of flu vaccine in healthy adults. To determine the dose-related effectiveness of flu vaccine in healthy adults approximately 1 month following receipt of 2 doses of vaccine. To provide information for the selection of the best dose levels for further studies.

=== H5 booster after two doses - June 2006 ===
Study start: October 2005; Study completion: June 2006

The purpose of this study is to determine whether a third dose of vaccines containing A/Vietnam/1203/04 provides more immunity than two doses. Subjects who participate in this study, will have participated in DMID protocol 04-063 involving the A/Vietnam/1203/04. In this study, each subject will be asked to receive a third dose of the H5 vaccine at the same level administered in protocol 04-063.

=== H5 in the elderly - August 2006 ===
Study start: October 2005; Study completion: August 2006

This study is intended to examine the safety and dose-related immunogenicity of three dosage levels of the Influenza A/H5N1 vaccine, as compared to saline placebo, given intramuscularly to healthy elderly adults approximately 4 weeks apart.

=== H5 in healthy adults - December 2006 ===
Study start: March 2006; Study completion: December 2006

This randomized, controlled, double-blinded, dose-ranging, Phase I-II study in 600 healthy adults, 18 to 49 years old, is designed to investigate the safety, reactogenicity, and dose-related immunogenicity of an investigational inactivated influenza A/H5N1 virus vaccine when given alone or combined with aluminum hydroxide. A secondary goal is to guide selection of vaccine dosage levels for expanded Phase II trials based on reactogenicity and immunogenicity profiles. This dose optimization will be applied to both younger and older subject populations in subsequent studies. Subjects who meet the entry criteria for the study will be enrolled at one of up to 5 study sites and will be randomized into 8 groups to receive two doses of influenza A/H5N1 vaccine containing 3.75, 7.5, 15, or 45 mcg of HA with or without aluminum hydroxide adjuvant by IM injection (N= 60 or 120/vaccine dose group).

=== Bird flu - November 2006 ===
Study start: March 2006; Study completion: November 2006

This study is designed to gather critical information on the safety, tolerability, and the immunogenicity (capability of inducing an immune response) of A/H5N1 virus vaccine in healthy adults. Up to 280 healthy adults, aged 18 to 64, will participate in the study. Each subject will participate for 7 months and will be randomly placed in one of several different study groups receiving a different dose of vaccine, vaccine plus adjuvant, or placebo. All subjects will receive two injections of their assigned study product, about 28 days apart, in their muscle tissue. Subjects will keep a journal of their temperature and any adverse effects between study visits. A small amount of blood will also be drawn before the first injection, 7 days after each injection, and 6 months after the second injection.

=== Pandemic flu - January 2007 ===
Study start: October 2005; Study completion: January 2007

This Australian study will test the safety and immunogenicity of an H5N1 pandemic influenza vaccine in healthy adults.

=== Children - February 2007 ===
Study start: January 2006; Study completion: February 2007

This is a randomized, double-blinded, placebo-controlled, staged, dose-ranging, Phase I/II study to evaluate the safety, reactogenicity, and immunogenicity of 2 doses of an IM inactivated influenza A/H5N1 vaccine in healthy children, aged 2 through 9 years. This study is designed to investigate the safety, tolerability, and dose-related immunogenicity of an investigational inactivated influenza A/H5N1 vaccine. A secondary goal is to identify an optimal dosage level of the vaccine that generates an acceptable immunogenic response, while maintaining an adequate safety profile.
