= Global spread of H5N1 =

Spread of bird flu

Cumulative Human Cases of and Deaths from H5N1 As of April 11, 2007
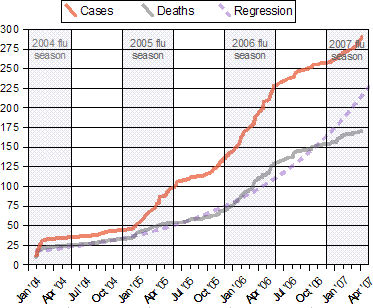
- Notes: Source WHO Confirmed Human Cases of H5N1; "[T]he incidence of human cases peaked, in each of the three years in which cases have occurred, during the period roughly corresponding to winter and spring in the northern hemisphere. If this pattern continues, an upsurge in cases could be anticipated starting in late 2006 or early 2007." Avian influenza – epidemiology of human H5N1 cases reported to WHO; The regression curve for deaths is y = a + e^{k x}, and is shown extended through the end of April, 2007.

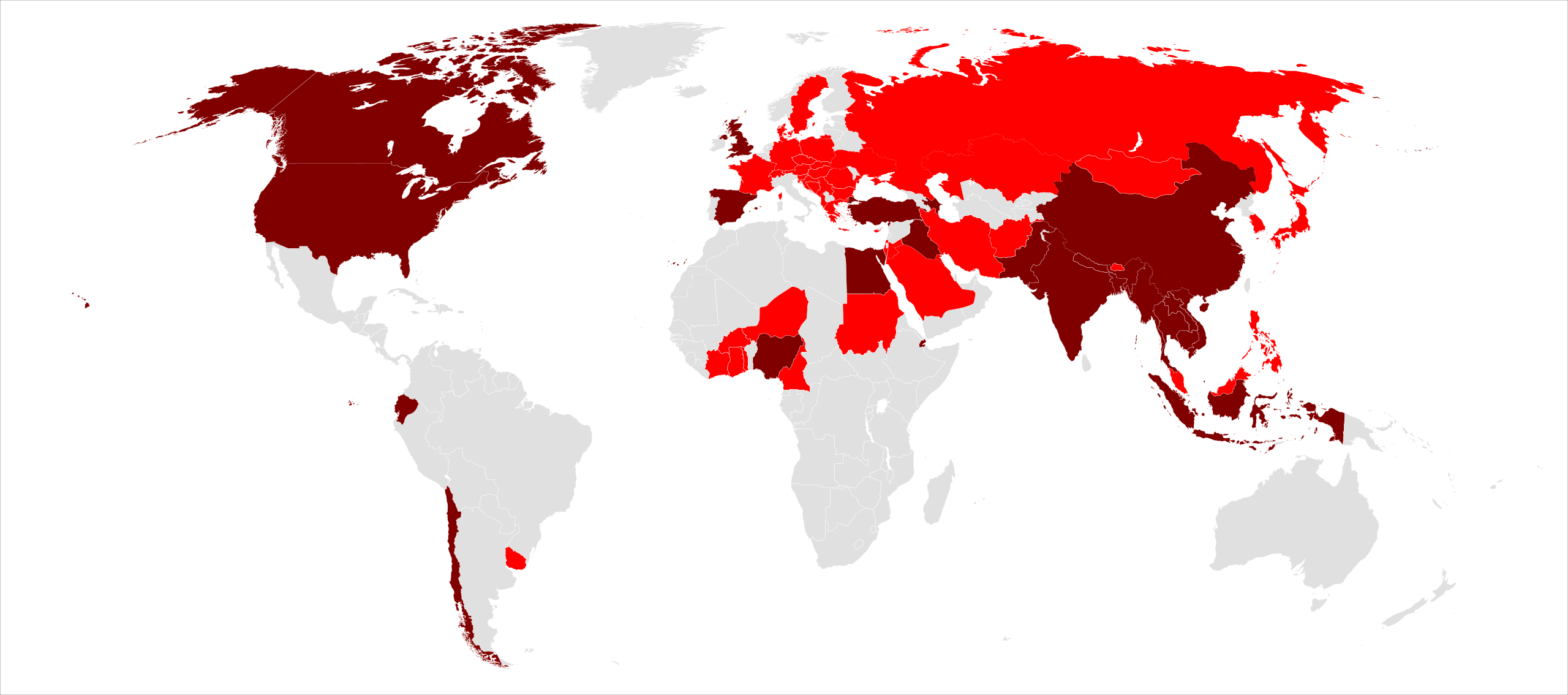
Highly pathogenic H5N1
Highly pathogenic H5N1
Countries that have reported deaths of poultry or wild birds linked to highly pathogenic H5N1 infection as of March 2023.
Countries that have reported human cases of highly pathogenic H5N1 infection.

The global spread of H5N1 influenza in birds is considered a significant pandemic threat. While other H5N1 influenza strains are known, they are significantly different on a genetic level from a highly pathogenic, emergent strain of H5N1, which was able to achieve hitherto unprecedented global spread in 2008. The H5N1 strain is a fast-mutating, highly pathogenic avian influenza virus (HPAI) found in multiple bird species. It is both epizootic (an epidemic in non-humans) and panzootic (a disease affecting animals of many species especially over a wide area). Unless otherwise indicated, "H5N1" in this timeline refers to the 2008 highly pathogenic strain of H5N1.

Tens of millions of birds have died of H5N1 influenza and hundreds of millions of birds have been slaughtered and disposed of, to limit the spread of H5N1. Countries that have reported one or more major highly pathogenic H5N1 outbreaks in birds (causing at least thousands but in some cases millions of dead birds) are (in order of first outbreak occurrence): South Korea, Vietnam, Japan, Thailand, Cambodia, Laos, Indonesia, China, Malaysia, Russia, Kazakhstan, Mongolia, Turkey, Romania, Croatia, Ukraine, Cyprus, Iraq, Nigeria, Egypt, India, France, Niger, Bosnia, Azerbaijan, Albania, Cameroon, Myanmar, Afghanistan, Israel, Pakistan, Jordan, Burkina Faso, Germany, Sudan, Ivory Coast, Djibouti, Hungary, United Kingdom, Kuwait, Bangladesh, Saudi Arabia, Ghana, Czech Republic, Togo, Nepal, Bhutan, the Philippines, and Chile.

Highly pathogenic H5N1 has been found in birds in the wild in numerous other countries: Austria, Belgium, Bulgaria, Denmark, Greece, Iran, Italy, Poland, Serbia and Montenegro, Slovakia, Slovenia, Spain, Sweden, Switzerland, and Uruguay. Surveillance of H5N1 in humans, poultry, wild birds, cats and other animals remains very weak in many parts of Asia and Africa. Much remains unknown about the exact extent of its spread.

H5N1 has low pathogenic varieties endemic in birds in North America. H5N1 has a highly pathogenic variety that is endemic in dozens of species of birds throughout south Asia and parts of Africa. So far, it is very difficult for humans to become infected with H5N1. The presence of highly pathogenic (deadly) H5N1 around the world in both birds in the wild (swans, magpies, ducks, geese, pigeons, eagles, etc.) and in chickens and turkeys on farms has been demonstrated in millions of cases with the virus isolate actually sequenced in hundreds of cases yielding definitive proof of the evolution of this strain of this subtype of the species Influenzavirus A (bird flu virus).

According to Robert G. Webster:

The epicenters of both the Asian influenza pandemic of 1957 and the Hong Kong influenza pandemic of 1968 were in Southeast Asia, and it is in this region that multiple clades of H5N1 influenza virus have already emerged. The Asian H5N1 virus was first detected in Guangdong Province, China, in 1996, when it killed some geese, but it received little attention until it spread through live-poultry markets in Hong Kong to humans in May 1997, killing 6 of 18 infected people. [...] From 1997 to May 2005, H5N1 viruses were largely confined to Southeast Asia, but after they had infected wild birds in Qinghai Lake, China, they rapidly spread westward. [...] The intermittent spread to humans will continue, and the virus will continue to evolve.Map

On July 25, 2008, the Food and Agriculture Organization (FAO) released an Avian Influenza Disease Emergency Situation Update, reporting that H5N1 pathogenicity was continuing to gradually rise in endemic areas but the avian influenza disease situation in farmed birds was being held in check by vaccination. Eleven outbreaks of H5N1 were reported worldwide in June 2008 in five countries (China, Egypt, Indonesia, Pakistan and Vietnam) compared to 65 outbreaks in June 2006 and 55 in June 2007.

== Human cases ==
Between 2003 and December 2025, the World Health Organization has recorded 993 cases of confirmed H5N1 influenza, leading to 477 deaths. The true fatality rate is presumably lower because cases with mild symptoms may not have been identified as H5N1.

Confirmed human cases and mortality rate of avian influenza (H5N1) 2003–2025
Year	Cases	Deaths	CFR
2003	4	4	100%
2004	46	32	70%
2005	98	43	44%
2006	115	79	69%
2007	88	59	67%
2008	44	33	75%
2009	73	32	44%
2010	48	24	50%
2011	62	34	55%
2012	32	20	63%
2013	39	25	64%
2014	52	22	42%
2015	145	42	29%
2016	10	3	30%
2017	4	2	50%
2018	0	0	N/A
2019	1	1	100%
2020	1	0	0%
2021	2	1	50%
2022	6	1	17%
2023	12	4	33%
2024	81	4	5%
2025	30	12	40%
Total	993	477	48%

Updated 22 Jan 2026
Source: World Health Organization Global Influenza Program Cumulative Cases Report ·

== Timeline ==
=== 1959–1997 ===
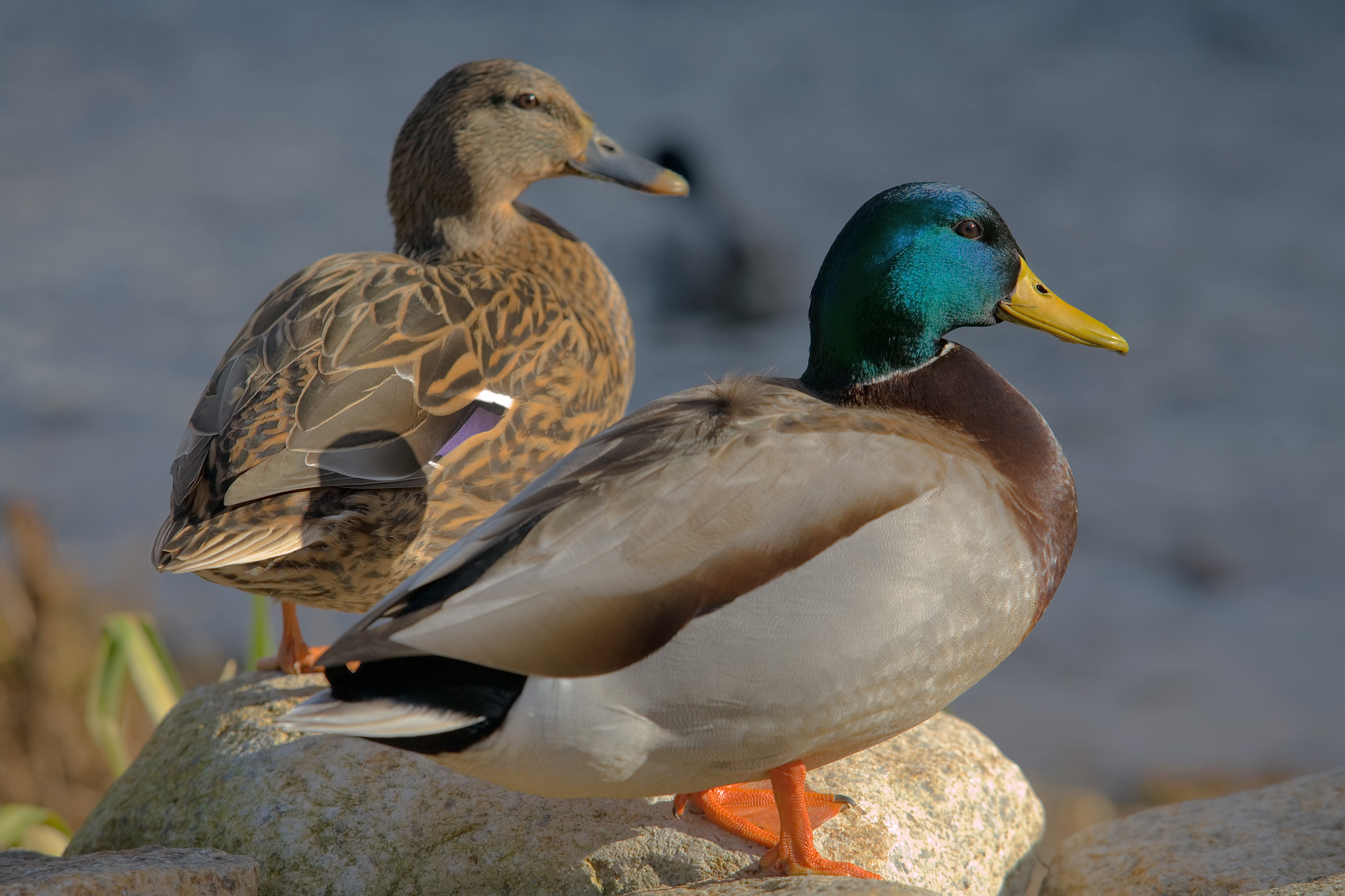
Ducks play a key role in H5N1 spread

- A highly pathogenic strain of H5N1 caused flu outbreaks with significant spread to numerous farms, resulting in great economic losses in 1959 in Scotland in chickens and in 1991 in England in turkeys. These strains were somewhat similar to the current pathogenic strain of H5N1 in two of its ten genes, the gene that causes it to be type H5 and the gene that causes it to be N1. The other genes can and have been reassorted from other subtypes of the bird flu species (their ease at exchanging genes is part of what makes them all one species). Evolution by reassortment of H5N1 from 1999 to 2002 created the Z genotype which became the dominant strain of highly pathogenic H5N1 in 2004 and is now spreading across the entire world in both wild and domestic birds.
- "The precursor of the H5N1 influenza virus that spread to humans in 1997 was first detected in Guangdong, China, in 1996, when it caused a moderate number of deaths in geese and attracted very little attention."
- In 1997, in Hong Kong, 18 humans were infected and 6 died in the first known case of H5N1 infecting humans.
- On December 28 to 29, 1997, 1.3 million chickens were killed by the government of Hong Kong. The government also suspended the import of chickens from mainland China.

=== 2003 ===
- In 2003 the first cases in humans since 1997 were diagnosed. Three people in one family were infected after visiting Fujian province in mainland China and 2 died.
- By midyear of 2003 outbreaks of poultry disease caused by H5N1 occurred in Asia, but were not recognized as such. That December animals in a Thai zoo died after eating infected chicken carcasses. Later that month H5N1 infection was detected in 3 flocks in the Republic of Korea.
- H5N1 in China in this and later periods is less than fully reported. Blogs have described many discrepancies between official mainland Chinese government announcements concerning H5N1 and what people in mainland China see with their own eyes. Many reports of total H5N1 cases exclude mainland China due to widespread disbelief in mainland China's official numbers.

=== 2004 ===
In January 2004 a major new outbreak of H5N1 surfaced in Vietnam and Thailand's poultry industry, and within weeks spread to ten countries and regions in Asia, including Indonesia, South Korea, Japan and China. In October 2004 researchers discovered H5N1 is far more dangerous than previously believed because waterfowl, especially ducks, were directly spreading the highly pathogenic strain of H5N1 to chickens, crows, pigeons, and other birds and that it was increasing its ability to infect mammals as well. From this point on, avian influenza experts increasingly refer to containment as a strategy that can delay but not prevent a future avian flu pandemic.

Variants have been found in a number of domestic cats, leopards, and tigers in Thailand, with high lethality. "The Thailand Zoo tiger outbreak killed more than 140 tigers, causing health officials to make the decision to cull all the sick tigers in an effort to stop the zoo from becoming a reservoir for H5N1 influenza. A study of domestic cats showed H5N1 virus infection by ingestion of infected poultry and also by contact with other infected cats (Kuiken et al., 2004)." The initial OIE report reads: "the clinical manifestations began on 11 October 2004 with weakness, lethargy, respiratory distress, and high fever (about 41-42 degrees Celsius). There was no response to any antibiotic treatment. Death occurred within three days following the onset of clinical signs with severe pulmonary lesions."

=== 2005 ===
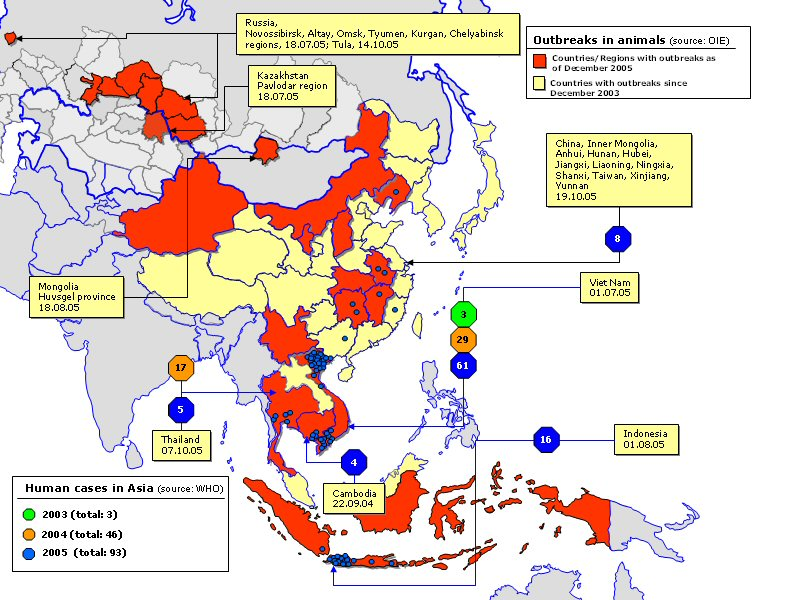
The spread of avian influenza in the eastern hemisphere.

In January 2005 an outbreak of avian influenza affected thirty three out of sixty four cities and provinces in Vietnam, leading to the forced killing of nearly 1.2 million poultry. Up to 140 million birds are believed to have died or been killed because of the outbreak. In April 2005 there begins an unprecedented die-off of over 6,000 migratory birds at Qinghai Lake in central China over three months. This strain of H5N1 is the same strain as is spread west by migratory birds over at least the next ten months. In August 2005 H5N1 spread to Kazakhstan, Mongolia and Russia. On September 29, 2005, David Nabarro, the newly appointed Senior United Nations System Coordinator for Avian and Human Influenza, warned the world that an outbreak of avian influenza could kill 5 to 150 million people. David Nabarro later stated that as the virus had spread to migratory birds, an outbreak could start in Africa or the Middle East. Later in 2005 H5N1 spread to Turkey, Romania, Croatia and Kuwait.

In 2005, it was discovered that H5N1 "could be infecting up to half of the pig population in some areas of Indonesia, but without causing symptoms [...] Chairul Nidom, a virologist at Airlangga University's tropical disease center in Surabaya, Java, was conducting independent research earlier this year. He tested the blood of 10 apparently healthy pigs housed near poultry farms in western Java where avian flu had broken out, Nature reported. Five of the pig samples contained the H5N1 virus. The Indonesian government has since found similar results in the same region, Nature reported. Additional tests of 150 pigs outside the area were negative."

=== 2006 ===
- In the first two months of 2006 H5N1 spread to other Asian countries (such as India), north Africa, and Europe in wild bird populations possibly signaling the beginning of H5N1 being endemic in wild migratory bird populations on multiple continents for decades, permanently changing the way poultry are farmed.
- By April 2006 scientists had concluded that containment had failed due to the role of wild birds in transmitting the virus and were now emphasizing far more comprehensive risk mitigation and management measures.
- In June 2006 WHO predicted an upsurge in human deaths due to H5N1 during late 2006 or early 2007 following a summer/fall lull in most countries, as H5N1 appears to be somewhat seasonal in nature. In July and August 2006 significantly increased numbers of bird deaths due to H5N1 were recorded in Cambodia, China, Laos, Nigeria, and Thailand while continuing unabated a rate unparalleled in Indonesia.
- In June, there was a human outbreak in Indonesia when 8 members of a family in Sumatra became infected and 7 died. The WHO reported that this may have been the first recorded instance of human-to-human transmission.
- In September, Egypt and Sudan joined the list of nations seeing a resurgence of bird deaths due to H5N1.
- In November and December, South Korea and Vietnam joined the list of nations seeing a resurgence of bird deaths due to H5N1
- February/March 2006 - A dead cat infected with the H5N1 bird flu virus was found in Germany. Hans Seitinger, the top agriculture official in the southern state of Styria, Austria announced that several still living cats in Styria have tested positive for H5N1:
- February 2006 - H5N1 infection killed up to five cats and 51 chickens in Iraq.

=== 2007 ===
In January, Japan, Hungary, Russia, and the United Kingdom joined the list of nations seeing a resurgence of bird deaths due to H5N1. In February, Pakistan, Turkey, Afghanistan, and Myanmar joined the list and Kuwait saw its first major outbreak of H5N1 avian influenza.

In March Bangladesh and Saudi Arabia each saw their first major outbreak of H5N1 avian influenza and Ghana in May.

As H5N1 continued killing many birds and a few people throughout the spring in countries where it is now endemic, in June Malaysia and Germany saw a resurgence of bird deaths due to H5N1, while the Czech Republic and Togo experienced their first major outbreak of H5N1 avian influenza.

In July France and India also saw a resurgence of bird deaths due to H5N1.

==== January 24, 2007 ====
"Chairul Anwar Nidom of Airlangga University in Surabaya, Indonesia, told journalists last week that he had taken blood samples from 500 stray cats near poultry markets in four areas of Java, including the capital, Jakarta, and one area in Sumatra, all of which have recently had outbreaks of H5N1 in poultry and people. Of these cats, 20% carried antibodies to H5N1. This does not mean that they were still carrying the virus, only that they had been infected - probably through eating birds that had H5N1. Many other cats that were infected are likely to have died from the resulting illness, so many more than 20% of the original cat populations may have acquired H5N1."

=== 2008 ===
==== January ====
- January 24, 2008: China's health ministry has confirmed a 22-year-old man has died from H5N1 in central Hunan province.

==== February ====
- February 26, 2008: H5N1 killed a school teacher from northern Vietnam in the country's 51st death from the disease, and health officials fretted that the virus would spread further.
- February 28, 2008: There are no indications that H5N1 is becoming a bigger problem in China despite the deaths of three people from the disease this year, the World Health Organisation said Wednesday.

==== March ====
- March 4, 2008: H5N1 virus confirmed as the cause of death for a 25-year-old female from Sennoris District, Fayum Governorate, Egypt.

==== June ====
- June 7, 2008: Hong Kong found the H5N1 bird flu virus at a poultry stall in Sham Shui Po. 2,700 birds were ordered to be killed by the local government. A new regulation requires all live chickens not sold by 8pm to be killed. The chairman of the Hong Kong Poultry Wholesalers Association said the government's decision makes it very difficult for their business to continue. Retailers who keep live poultry after 8pm are now subject to a fine of HK$50,000 and six months imprisonment.

==== July ====
As of the July 25, 2008 FAO Avian Influenza Disease Emergency Situation Update, H5N1 pathogenicity is continuing to gradually rise in wild birds in endemic areas but the avian influenza disease situation in farmed birds is being held in check by vaccination. Eleven outbreaks of H5N1 were reported worldwide in June 2008 in five countries (China, Egypt, Indonesia, Pakistan and Vietnam) compared to 65 outbreaks in June 2006 and 55 in June 2007. The "global HPAI situation can be said to have improved markedly in the first half of 2008 [but] cases of HPAI are still underestimated and underreported in many countries because of limitations in country disease surveillance systems".

=== 2009 ===
==== January ====
- January 16, 2009: H5N1 hits Nepal for first time. In a January 16 report to the World Organization for Animal Health (OIE), government officials in Nepal said the virus struck backyard poultry in a village in Jhapa district in the southeastern corner of Nepal. Though the Nepal Government announced that bird flu in the country's Kankarbhitta area is under control, avian virus surfaced again in Sharanamati of Jhapa district. Over 150 chickens died in the Indian border town, 35 km southwest of Kankarbhitta. The Ministry of Agriculture and Cooperatives declared the area surrounding Sharanamati a "bird-flu affected area" and increased surveillance along the border. A Rapid Response Team (RRT) was dispatched to control the virus. The government also banned the transportation of poultry products throughout the country. The first outbreak was confirmed in Kankarbhitta on January 16. 28,000 chickens were killed in the area to control the virus. Earlier, Agriculture Minister Jayprakash Gupta asked the international community and donor agencies to provide help to Nepal fight the disease. The Indo-Nepal border was in heightened alert because of the disease.

==== February ====
- February 21, 2009: H5N1 killed a 23-year-old woman named Lý Tài Múi from Nà Cáng, Quảng An, Đầm hà, Quảng Ninh Province, Vietnam.
- February 25, 2009: H5N1 virus confirmed as the cause of death for a 32-year-old man from Quảng Bình Province, Vietnam.

==== March ====
- March 19, 2009: H5N1 virus confirmed as the cause of death for a 3-year-old boy from Đồng Tháp Province, Vietnam.
- March 21, 2009: State media reported H5N1 might be the cause of a death of a female in Bạc Liêu, Vietnam.

==== April ====
- April 24, 2009: H5N1 virus confirmed as the cause of death for a 23-year-old woman from Thanh Hóa, Vietnam.

==== June ====
- July 1, 2009: Three cases of H5N1 were confirmed in Egypt, all three of whom recovered.

=== 2010 ===
==== February ====
- February 22, 2010: First case of H5N1 in birds confirmed in Bhutan in the district of Chhukha.

=== 2011 ===
==== June ====
- June 16, 2011: Five cases of H5N1 were confirmed in Egypt, three of which were fatal.

==== December ====
- December 20, 2011: Details of research on H5N1 on mutations which enable its transmission to ferrets —the standard mammalian model for influenza research— are requested by the U.S. National Security Advisory Board for Biotechnology (NSABB) to be redacted due to concerns over bioterrorism potential.

=== 2012 ===
==== February ====
- February 6, 2012: H5N1 is identified again in Nepal.
- February 17, 2012: WHO decides in a two-day meeting held in Geneva, Switzerland that additional analysis of public health and security risks is needed to determine whether research on man-made H5N1 virus capable of aerosol transmission between mammals (ferrets) should be released in full.

==== May ====
- May 27, 2012: A 10-year-old girl is to said to have died in the southwestern Kampong Speu province, Cambodia. According to the WHO in a joint statement with the Cambodian health ministry, the girl had developed shortness of breath and a fever on May 20 and died on Sunday May 27.

=== 2014 ===
==== January ====
- January 3, 2014: An Alberta, Canada resident dies of H5N1 after returning from Beijing, China and feeling unwell on a return flight from Beijing to Vancouver (Air Canada 030) and Vancouver to Edmonton (Air Canada 244) on December 27, 2013, and hospitalized on January 1, 2014; this is the first case in Canada and North America.

=== 2020 and subsequently ===
Outbreaks of avian influenza subtype H5N1 have been occurring since 2020, with cases reported from every continent. Some species of wild aquatic birds act as natural asymptomatic carriers of influenza A viruses, which can infect poultry, other bird species, mammals (including humans) if they come into close contact with infected feces or contaminated material, or by eating infected birds. The virus strain involved in the global outbreak is classified as H5N1 clade 2.3.4.4b, which has adapted to cause significant outbreaks in a broader range of species, mammals included.

- widespread in wild bird populations, in all continents
- frequently spilling over into poultry flocks, necessitating mass slaughter
- established in US dairy cows
- causing sporadic human cases, generally in people exposed to infected birds or cattle
- known to have infected at least 43 species of mammal

== Mammals ==
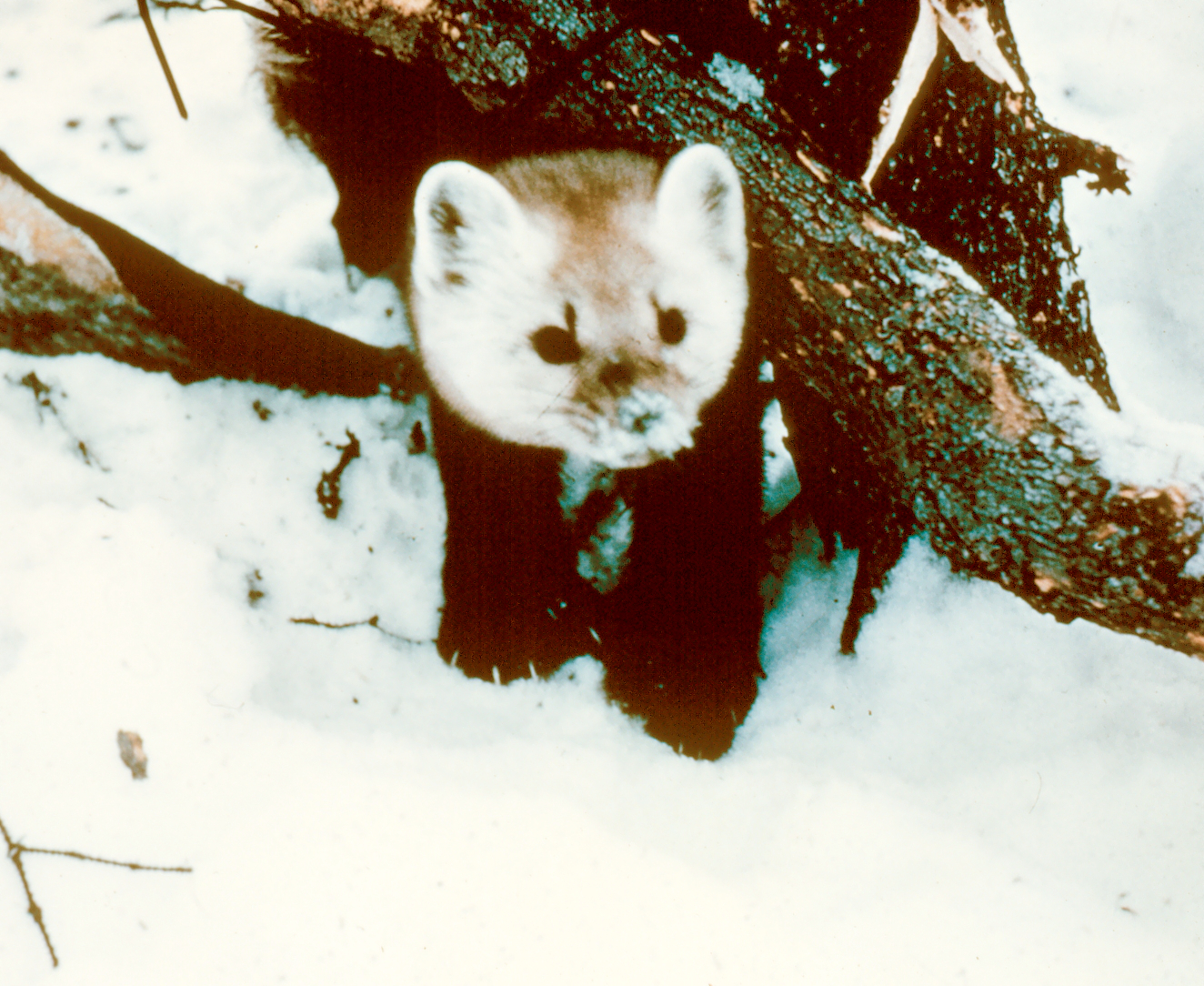
Martens and an unknown number of other mammals can catch H5N1, illustrating the unprecedented ability of H5N1 to survive and spread.

H5N1 has been transmitted in laboratories to many species including mice and ferrets to study its effects. A purposely mutated strain in ferrets has engendered a notable international policy debate regarding the openness of scientific research, the mandates of public health, and the potential for bioterrorism.

H5N1 was transmitted in the wild to three civet cats in Vietnam in August 2005 and a stone marten in Germany in March 2006.

The BBC reported that a stray dog in Azerbaijan died from the disease on March 15, 2006.

People living in areas where the A(H5N1) virus has infected birds are advised to keep their cats indoors. "Cats can be infected through the respiratory tract. Cats can also be infected when they ingest the virus, which is a novel route for influenza transmission in mammals. But cats excrete only one-thousandth the amount of virus that chickens do [...] The concern is that if large numbers of felines and other carnivores become infected, the virus might mutate in a series of events that could lead to an epidemic among humans. Dogs, foxes, seals, and other carnivores may be vulnerable to A(H5N1) virus infection, Dr. Osterhaus said. Tests in Thailand have shown that the virus has infected dogs without causing apparent symptoms."

In early April 2024, H5N1 was reported to have spread amongst dairy cow herds in multiple states of the US, indicating cow-to-cow spread, possibly occurring while the animals were being milked. A dairy worker in Texas also became infected, with conjunctivitis being the main symptom.

=== Suidae (pigs) ===
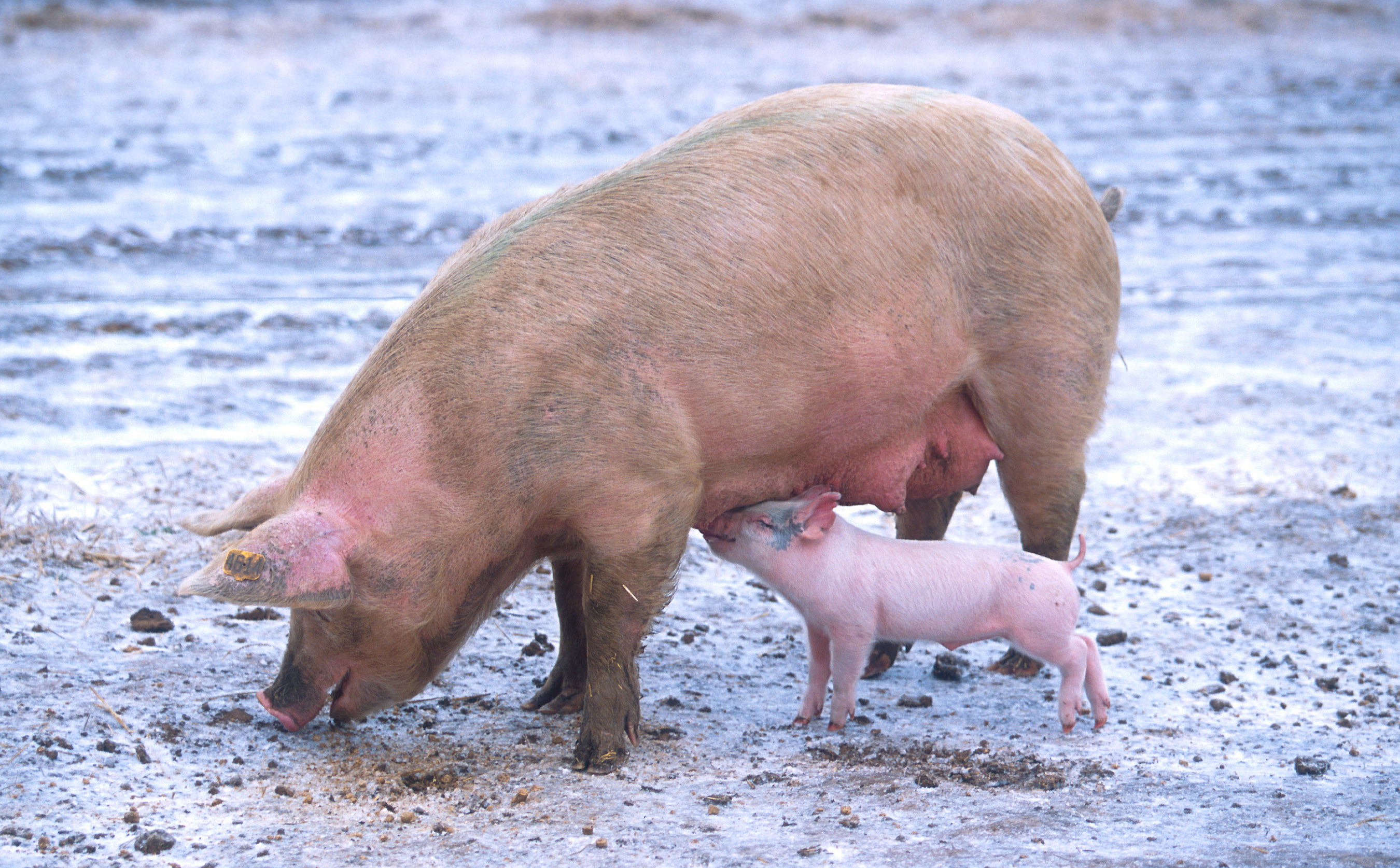
Pigs can harbor influenza viruses adapted to humans and others that are adapted to birds, allowing the viruses to exchange genes and create a pandemic strain.

Avian influenza virus H3N2 is endemic in pigs ("swine flu") in China and has been detected in pigs in Vietnam, increasing fears of the emergence of new variant strains. Health experts say pigs can carry human influenza viruses, which can combine (i.e. exchange homologous genome sub-units by genetic reassortment) with H5N1, passing genes and mutating into a form which can pass easily among humans. H3N2 evolved from H2N2 by antigenic shift and caused the Hong Kong Flu pandemic of 1968 and 1969 that killed up to 750,000 humans. The dominant strain of annual flu in humans in January 2006 is H3N2. Measured resistance to the standard antiviral drugs amantadine and rimantadine in H3N2 in humans has increased to 91% in 2005. A combination of these two subtypes of the species known as the avian influenza virus in a country like China is a worst-case scenario. In August 2004, researchers in China found H5N1 in pigs.

=== Felidae (cats) ===
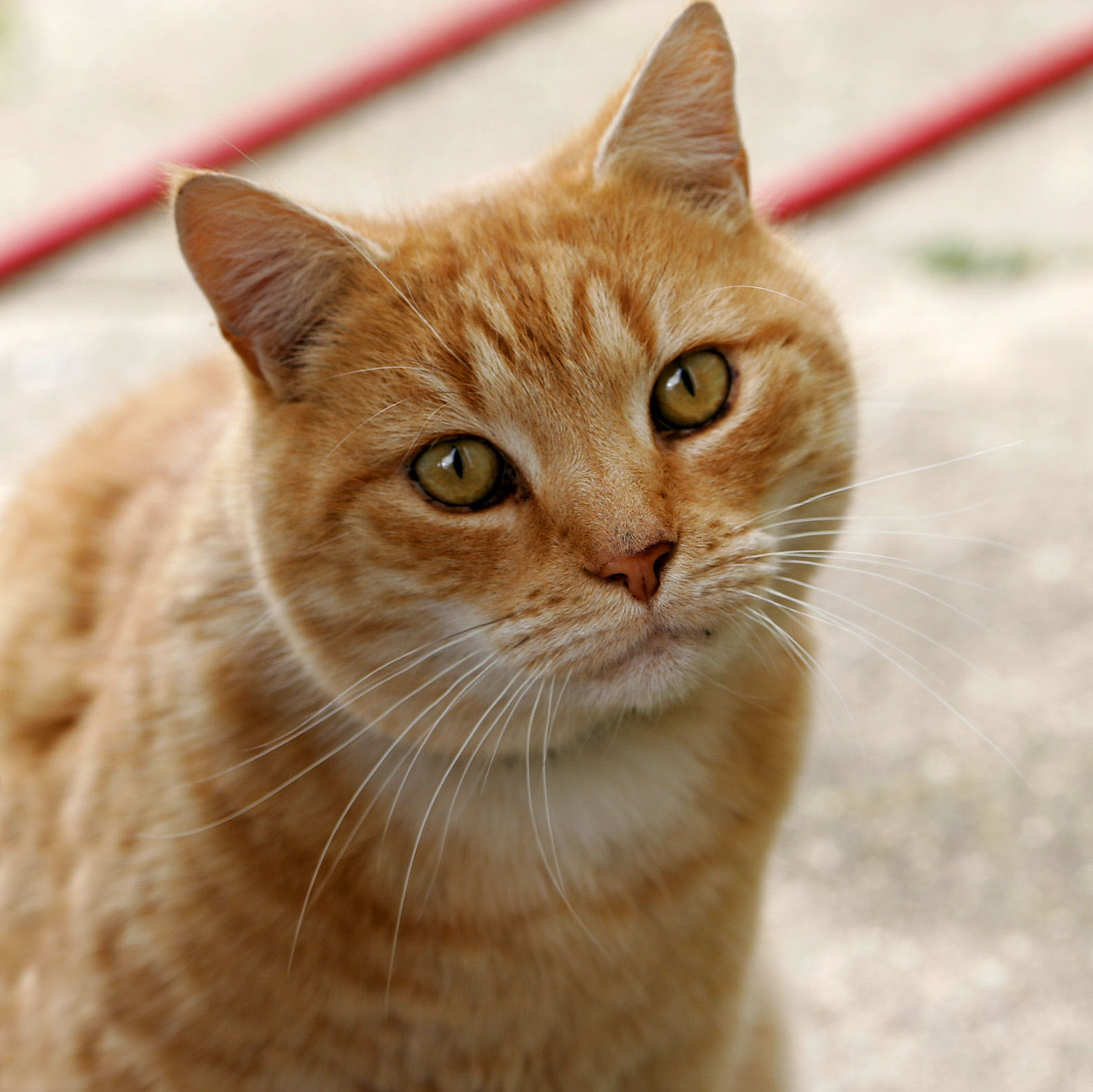
Domestic cats can get H5N1 from eating birds, and can transmit it to other cats and possibly to people.

In Bangkok, Thailand, all the cats in one household are known to have died of H5N1 in 2004. Tigers and leopards in Thai zoos also died, while in 2007 two cats near an outbreak in poultry and people in Iraq were confirmed to have died of H5N1, as were three German cats that ate wild birds. In Austria, cats were infected but remained healthy. Cats in Indonesia were also found to have been infected with H5N1.

The spread to species and populations of birds, and the ability of felids (cats) to catch H5N1 from eating this natural prey, means the creation of a reservoir for H5N1 in cats where the virus can adapt to mammals is one of the many possible pathways to a pandemic.

== See also ==
- Fujian flu
- Disease surveillance
- Human security
- 2002–2004 SARS outbreak
- Dog flu
- Horse flu
- Bird flu
- Yarding
