= Influenza pandemic =

Pandemic involving influenza

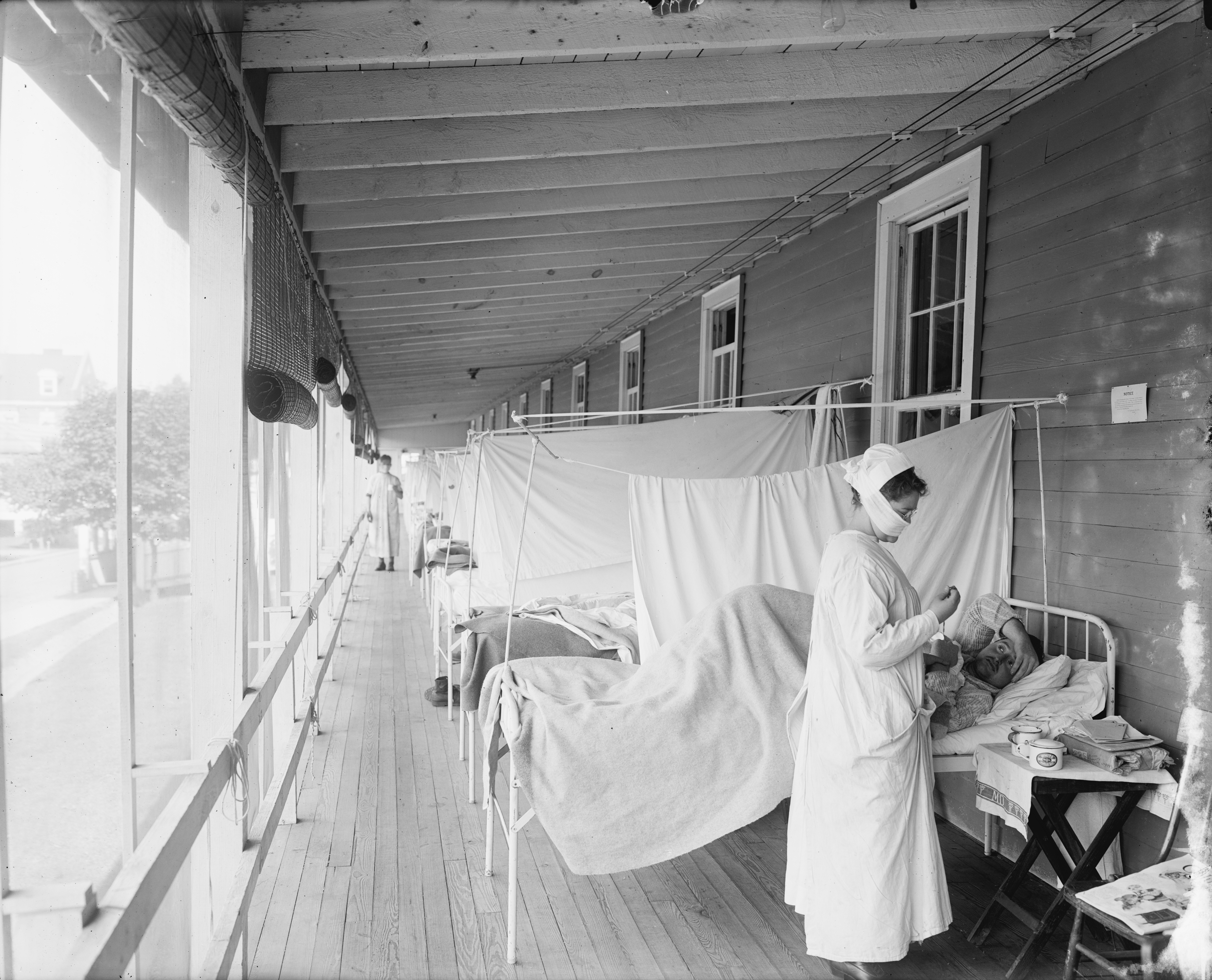
Influenza ward at Walter Reed Hospital, in Washington, D.C., during the 1918 flu pandemic

An influenza pandemic is an epidemic of an influenza virus that spreads across a large region (either multiple continents or worldwide) and infects a large proportion of the human population. There have been five major influenza pandemics in the last 140 years, with the 1918 flu pandemic being the most severe; this is estimated to have been responsible for the deaths of 50–100 million people. The 2009 swine flu pandemic resulted in under 300,000 deaths and is considered relatively mild. These pandemics occur irregularly.

Influenza pandemics occur when a new strain of the influenza virus is transmitted to humans from another animal species. Species that are thought to be important in the emergence of new human strains are pigs, chickens and ducks. These novel strains are unaffected by any immunity people may have to older strains of human influenza and can therefore spread extremely rapidly and infect very large numbers of people. Influenza A viruses can occasionally be transmitted from wild birds to other species, causing outbreaks in domestic poultry, and may give rise to human influenza pandemics. The propagation of influenza viruses throughout the world is thought to be in part by bird migrations, though commercial shipments of live bird products might also be implicated, as well as human travel patterns.

The World Health Organization (WHO) has produced a six-stage classification that describes the process by which a novel influenza virus moves from the first few infections in humans through to a pandemic. This starts with the virus mostly infecting animals, with a few cases where animals infect people, then moves through the stage where the virus begins to spread directly between people, and ends with a pandemic when infections from the new virus have spread worldwide.

One strain of virus that may produce a pandemic in the future is a highly pathogenic variation of the H5N1 subtype of influenza A virus. On 11 June 2009, a new strain of H1N1 influenza was declared to be a pandemic (Stage 6) by the WHO after evidence of spreading in the southern hemisphere. The 13 November 2009 worldwide update by the WHO stated that "[a]s of 8 November 2009, worldwide more than 206 countries and overseas territories or communities have reported [503,536] laboratory confirmed cases of pandemic influenza H1N1 2009, including over 6,250 deaths."

== Influenza ==
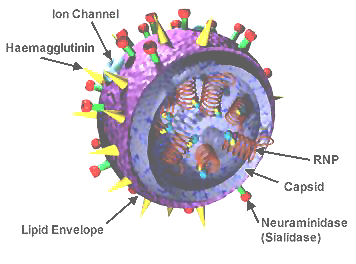
Structure of the influenza viron. The hemagglutinin (HA) and neuraminidase (NA) proteins are shown on the surface of the particle. The viral RNAs that make up the genome are shown as red coils inside the particle and bound to Ribonuclear Proteins (RNPs).

Influenza, commonly known as the flu, is an infectious disease of birds and mammals. It was thought to be caused by comets, earthquakes, volcanoes, cosmic dust, the rising and setting of the sun, vapors arising from the air and ground, or a blast from the stars. Now we know that it is caused by an RNA virus of the family Orthomyxoviridae (the influenza viruses). In humans, common symptoms of influenza infection are fever, sore throat, muscle pains, severe headache, coughing, and weakness and fatigue. In more serious cases, influenza causes pneumonia, which can be fatal, particularly in young children and the elderly. While sometimes confused with the common cold, influenza is a much more severe disease and is caused by a different type of virus. Although nausea and vomiting can be produced, especially in children, these symptoms are more characteristic of the unrelated gastroenteritis, which is sometimes called "stomach flu" or "24-hour flu."

Typically, influenza is transmitted from infected mammals through the air by coughs or sneezes, creating aerosols containing the virus, and from infected birds through their droppings. Influenza can also be transmitted by saliva, nasal secretions, feces, and blood. Healthy individuals can become infected if they breathe in a virus-laden aerosol directly, or if they touch their eyes, nose or mouth after touching any of the aforementioned bodily fluids (or surfaces contaminated with those fluids). Flu viruses can remain infectious for about one week at human body temperature, over 30 days at 0 °C (32 °F), and indefinitely at very low temperatures (such as lakes in northeast Siberia). Most influenza strains can be inactivated easily by disinfectants and detergents.

Flu spreads around the world in seasonal epidemics. Ten pandemics were recorded before the Spanish flu of 1918. Three influenza pandemics occurred during the 20th century and killed tens of millions of people, with each of these pandemics being caused by the appearance of a new strain of the virus in humans. Often, these new strains result from the spread of an existing flu virus to humans from other animal species, so close proximity between humans and animals can promote epidemics. Additionally, the wartime practice of packing together the severely ill in field hospitals can promote the spread of more virulent strains of influenza when such people would otherwise be isolated from others during peacetime.

Vaccinations against influenza are most commonly given to high-risk humans in industrialized countries and to farmed poultry. The most common human vaccine is the trivalent influenza vaccine that contains purified and inactivated material from three viral strains. Typically this vaccine includes material from two influenza A virus subtypes and one influenza B virus strain. A vaccine formulated for one year may be ineffective in the following year, since the influenza virus changes rapidly over time and different strains become dominant. Antiviral drugs can be used to treat influenza, with neuraminidase inhibitors being particularly effective.

== Variants and subtypes of Influenza A virus ==
Variants of Influenza A virus are identified and named according to the isolate that they are like and thus are presumed to share lineage (example Fujian flu virus like); according to their typical host (example Human flu virus); according to their subtype (example H3N2); and according to their deadliness (e.g., Low Pathogenic as discussed below). So, a flu from a virus similar to the isolate A/Fujian/411/2002(H3N2) is called Fujian flu, human flu, and H3N2 flu.

The various types of influenza viruses in humans. Solid squares show the appearance of a new strain, causing recurring influenza pandemics. Broken lines indicate uncertain strain identifications.

Variants are sometimes named according to the species (host) the strain is endemic in or adapted to. Some variants named using this convention are:

- Bird flu
- Dog flu
- Horse flu
- Human flu
- Swine flu

The Influenza A virus subtypes are labeled according to an H number (for hemagglutinin) and an N number (for neuraminidase). Each subtype virus has mutated into a variety of strains with differing pathogenic profiles; some pathogenic to one species but not others, some pathogenic to multiple species. Frequently, a newer strain will completely replace an older strain.

Because of the impact of avian influenza on economically important chicken farms, a classification system was devised in 1981 which divided avian virus strains as either highly pathogenic (and therefore potentially requiring vigorous control measures) or low pathogenic. The test for this is based solely on the effect on chickens - a virus strain is highly pathogenic avian influenza (HPAI) if 75% or more of chickens die after being deliberately infected with it. The alternative classification is low pathogenic avian influenza (LPAI). This classification system has since been modified to take into account the structure of the virus' haemagglutinin protein. Other species of birds, especially water birds, can become infected with HPAI virus without experiencing severe symptoms and can spread the infection over large distances; the exact symptoms depend on the species of bird and the strain of virus. Classification of an avian virus strain as HPAI or LPAI does not predict how serious the disease might be if it infects humans or other mammals.

== Nature of a flu pandemic ==
Some pandemics are relatively minor such as the one in 1957 called Asian flu (1–4 million dead, depending on source). Others have a higher Pandemic Severity Index whose severity warrants more comprehensive social isolation measures.

The 1918 pandemic killed tens of millions and sickened hundreds of millions; the loss of this many people in the population caused upheaval and psychological damage to many people. There were not enough doctors, hospital rooms, or medical supplies for the living as they contracted the disease. Dead bodies were often left unburied as few people were available to deal with them. There can be great social disruption as well as a sense of fear. Efforts to deal with pandemics can leave a great deal to be desired because of human selfishness, lack of trust, illegal behavior, and ignorance. For example, in the 1918 pandemic: "This horrific disconnect between reassurances and reality destroyed the credibility of those in authority. People felt they had no one to turn to, no one to rely on, no one to trust."

A letter from a physician at one U.S. Army camp in the 1918 pandemic said:

It is only a matter of a few hours then until death comes [...]. It is horrible. One can stand it to see one, two or twenty men die, but to see these poor devils dropping like flies [...]. We have been averaging about 100 deaths per day [...]. Pneumonia means in about all cases death [...]. We have lost an outrageous number of Nurses and Drs. It takes special trains to carry away the dead. For several days there were no coffins and the bodies piled up something fierce [...].

=== Wave nature ===
Flu pandemics typically come in waves. The 1889–1890 and 1918–1920 flu pandemics each came in three or four waves of increasing lethality. Within a wave, mortality was greater at the beginning of the wave.

=== Variable mortality ===
Mortality varies widely in a pandemic. In the 1918 pandemic:

In U.S. Army camps where reasonably reliable statistics were kept, case mortality often exceeded 5 percent, and in some circumstances exceeded 10 percent. In the British Army in India, case mortality for white troops was 9.6 percent, for Indian troops 21.9 percent. In isolated human populations, the virus killed at even higher rates. In the Fiji islands, it killed 14 percent of the entire population in 16 days. In Labrador and Alaska, it killed at least one-third of the entire native population.

== Influenza pandemics ==
A 1921 book lists nine influenza pandemics prior to the 1889–1890 flu, the first in 1510. A more modern source lists six.

Major modern influenza pandemics
Name	Date	World pop.	Subtype	Reproduction number	Infected (est.)	Deaths worldwide	Case fatality rate	Pandemic severity
Spanish flu	1918–20	1.80 billion	H1N1	1.80 (IQR, 1.47–2.27)	33% (500 million) or >56% (>1 billion)	17–100 million	2–3%, or ~4%, or ~10%	5
Asian flu	1957–58	2.90 billion	H2N2	1.65 (IQR, 1.53–1.70)	>17% (>500 million)	1–4 million	<0.2%	2
Hong Kong flu	1968–69	3.53 billion	H3N2	1.80 (IQR, 1.56–1.85)	>14% (>500 million)	1–4 million	<0.2%	2
2009 swine flu pandemic	2009–10	6.85 billion	H1N1/09	1.46 (IQR, 1.30–1.70)	11–21% (0.7–1.4 billion)	151,700–575,400	0.01%	1
Typical seasonal flu (Note: Not pandemic, but included for comparison purposes.)	Every year	7.75 billion	A/H3N2, A/H1N1, B, ...	1.28 (IQR, 1.19–1.37)	5–15% (340 million – 1 billion); 3–11% or 5–20% (240 million – 1.6 billion)	290,000–650,000/year	<0.1%	1

=== Asiatic flu (1889–1890) ===
The 1889–1890 pandemic, often referred to as the Asiatic flu or Russian flu, killed about 1 million people out of a world population of about 1.5 billion. It was long believed to be caused by an influenza A subtype (most often H2N2), but recent analysis largely brought on by the 2002-2004 SARS outbreak and the COVID-19 pandemic determined the outbreak to be more likely caused by a coronavirus.

=== Spanish flu (1918–1920) ===
The 1918 flu pandemic, commonly referred to as the Spanish flu, was a category 5 influenza pandemic caused by an unusually severe and deadly Influenza A virus strain of subtype H1N1.

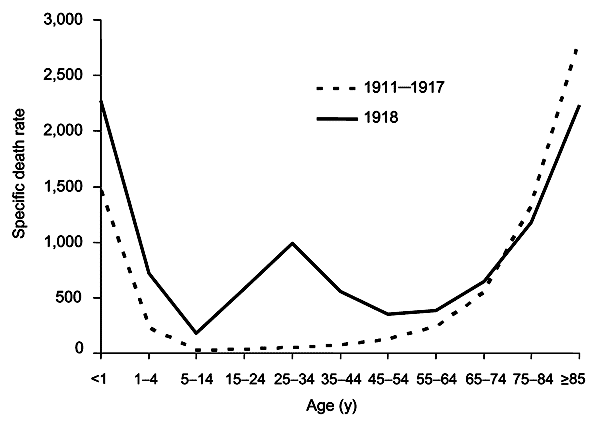
The difference between the influenza mortality age-distributions of the 1918 epidemic and normal epidemics. Deaths per 100,000 persons in each age group, United States, for the interpandemic years 1911–1917 (dashed line) and the pandemic year 1918 (solid line).

The Spanish flu pandemic lasted from 1918 to 1920. Various estimates say it killed between 17 million and 100 million people This pandemic has been described as "the greatest medical holocaust in history" and may have killed as many people as the Black Death, although the Black Death is estimated to have killed over a fifth of the world's population at the time, a significantly higher proportion. This huge death toll was caused by an extremely high infection rate of up to 50% and the extreme severity of the symptoms, suspected to be caused by cytokine storms. Indeed, symptoms in 1918 were so unusual that initially influenza was misdiagnosed as dengue, cholera, or typhoid. One observer wrote, "One of the most striking of the complications was hemorrhage from mucous membranes, especially from the nose, stomach, and intestine. Bleeding from the ears and petechial hemorrhages in the skin also occurred." The majority of deaths were from bacterial pneumonia, a secondary infection caused by influenza, but the virus also killed people directly, causing massive hemorrhages and edema in the lung.

The Spanish flu pandemic was truly global, spreading even to the Arctic and remote Pacific islands. The unusually severe disease killed between 10 and 20% of those infected, as opposed to the more usual flu epidemic mortality rate of 0.1%. Another unusual feature of this pandemic was that it mostly killed young adults, with 99% of pandemic influenza deaths occurring in people under 65, and more than half in young adults 20 to 40 years old. This is unusual since influenza is normally most deadly to the very young (under age 2) and the very old (over age 70). The total mortality of the 1918–1920 pandemic is estimated to be between 17 and 100 million people, constituting approximately 1–6% of the world's population. As many as 25 million may have been killed in the first 25 weeks; in contrast, HIV/AIDS has killed 25 million in its first 25 years.

=== Asian flu (1957–1958) ===
The Asian flu was a category 2 flu pandemic outbreak caused by a strain of H2N2 that originated in China in early 1957, lasting until 1958. The virus originated from a mutation in wild ducks combining with a pre-existing human strain. The virus was first identified in Guizhou in late February; by mid-March it had spread across the entire mainland. It was not until the virus had reached Hong Kong in April, however, that the world was alerted to the unusual situation, when the international press began to report on the outbreak. The World Health Organization was officially informed when the virus arrived in Singapore, which operated the only influenza surveillance laboratory in Southeast Asia, in early May. From that point on, as the virus continued to sweep the region, the WHO remained attuned to the developing outbreak and helped coordinate the global response for the duration of the pandemic.

This was the first pandemic to occur during what is considered the "era of modern virology". One significant development since the 1918 pandemic was the identification of the causative agent behind the flu. Later, it was recognized that the influenza virus changes over time, typically only slightly (a process called "antigenic drift"), sometimes significantly enough to result in a new subtype ("antigenic shift"). Within weeks of the report out of Hong Kong, laboratories in the United States, the United Kingdom, and Australia had analyzed the virus and concluded that it was a novel strain of influenza A. Chinese researchers had already come to a similar conclusion in March, but as China was not a member of the WHO nor a part of its network of National Influenza Centers, this information did not reach the rest of the world, a fact which the WHO would lament after the pandemic.

The virus swept across the Middle East, Africa, and the Southern Hemisphere in the middle months of the year, causing widespread outbreaks. By the end of September, nearly the entire inhabited world had been infected or at least seeded with the virus. Around this time, extensive epidemics developed in the Northern Hemisphere following the opening of schools, generally peaking in North America and Europe in October. Some countries experienced a second wave in the final months of the year; Japan experienced a particularly severe resurgence in October. Influenza activity had largely subsided by the end of the year and remained apparently low during the first months of 1958, though some countries, such as the United States, experienced another rise in mortality from respiratory disease, of unclear origin.

The disease tended to resemble seasonal influenza in its presentation; the WHO described it at the time as "uniformly benign". However, there was the potential for complications, of which there was some variability. Most deaths were a result of bacterial pneumonia, though cases of this condition were attenuated through the use of antibiotics that did not exist in 1918. There were also detailed accounts of fatal primary influenza pneumonia, with no indication of bacterial infection. Those with underlying conditions such as cardiovascular disease were at greater risk of developing these pneumonias; pregnant women were also vulnerable to complications. In general, the elderly experienced the greatest rates of mortality. Estimates of worldwide deaths vary widely depending on the source, ranging from 1 million to 4 million. Mortality in the US has been estimated between 60,000 and 80,000 deaths. Pandemic impact continued over several years in many countries, with Latin America experiencing considerable excess mortality through 1959. Chile experienced notably severe mortality over the course of two waves during this period.

This was the most publicized influenza epidemic at the time of its occurrence. As the first pandemic to occur in the context of a global surveillance network, it was also the first time that preparations could be made ahead of an anticipated epidemic. Vaccination efforts were undertaken in some countries such as the US, though it is doubtful how successful such campaigns were with altering the courses of individual epidemics, mainly due to the timing of when the vaccines became widely available and how many people were able to be effectively immunized before the peak.

=== Hong Kong flu (1968–1970) ===
The Hong Kong flu was a category 2 flu pandemic caused by a strain of H3N2 descended from H2N2 by antigenic shift, in which genes from multiple subtypes reassorted to form a new virus. This pandemic killed an estimated 1–4 million people worldwide. Those over 65 had the greatest death rates. In the US, there were about 100,000 deaths.

=== H1N1/09 flu pandemic (2009–2010) ===
An epidemic of influenza-like illness of unknown causation occurred in Mexico in March–April 2009. On 24 April 2009, following the isolation of an A/H1N1 influenza in seven ill patients in the southwest US, the WHO issued a statement on the outbreak of "influenza like illness" that confirmed cases of A/H1N1 influenza had been reported in Mexico, and that 20 confirmed cases of the disease had been reported in the US. The next day, the number of confirmed cases rose to 40 in the US, 26 in Mexico, six in Canada, and one in Spain. The disease spread rapidly through the rest of the spring, and by 3 May, a total of 787 confirmed cases had been reported worldwide.

On 11 June 2009, the ongoing outbreak of Influenza A/H1N1, commonly referred to as swine flu, was officially declared by the WHO to be the first influenza pandemic of the 21st century and a new strain of Influenza A virus subtype H1N1 first identified in April 2009. It is thought to be a mutation (reassortment) of four known strains of influenza A virus subtype H1N1: one endemic in humans, one endemic in birds, and two endemic in pigs (swine). The rapid spread of this new virus was likely due to a general lack of pre-existing antibody-mediated immunity in the human population.

On 1 November 2009, a worldwide update by the WHO stated that "199 countries and overseas territories/communities have officially reported a total of over 482,300 laboratory confirmed cases of the influenza pandemic H1N1 infection, that included 6,071 deaths." By the end of the pandemic, declared on 10 August 2010, there were more than 18,000 laboratory-confirmed deaths from H1N1. Due to inadequate surveillance and lack of healthcare in many countries, the actual total of cases and deaths was likely much higher than reported. Experts, including the WHO, have since agreed that an estimated 284,500 people were killed by the disease, about 15 times the number of deaths in the initial death toll.

== Other pandemic threat subtypes ==
"Human influenza virus" usually refers to those subtypes that spread widely among humans. H1N1, H1N2, and H3N2 are the only known Influenza A virus subtypes currently circulating among humans.

Genetic factors in distinguishing between "human flu viruses" and "avian influenza viruses" include:

PB2: (RNA polymerase): Amino acid (or residue) position 627 in the PB2 protein encoded by the PB2 RNA gene. Until H5N1, all known avian influenza viruses had a glutamic acid at position 627, while all human influenza viruses had a lysine.
HA: (hemagglutinin): Avian influenza HA bind alpha 2–3 sialic acid receptors while human influenza HA bind alpha 2–6 sialic acid receptors.

"About 52 key genetic changes distinguish avian influenza strains from those that spread easily among people, according to researchers in Taiwan, who analyzed the genes of more than 400 A type flu viruses." "How many mutations would make an avian virus capable of infecting humans efficiently, or how many mutations would render an influenza virus a pandemic strain, is difficult to predict. We have examined sequences from the 1918 strain, which is the only pandemic influenza virus that could be entirely derived from avian strains. Of the 52 species-associated positions, 16 have residues typical for human strains; the others remained as avian signatures. The result supports the hypothesis that the 1918 pandemic virus is more closely related to the avian influenza A virus than are other human influenza viruses."

Highly pathogenic H5N1 avian influenza kills 50% of humans that catch it. In one case, a boy with H5N1 experienced diarrhea followed rapidly by a coma without developing respiratory or flu-like symptoms.

The Influenza A virus subtypes that have been confirmed in humans, ordered by the number of known human pandemic deaths, are:

- H1N1 caused Spanish flu, 1977 Russian flu, and the 2009 swine flu pandemic (novel H1N1)
- H2N2 caused Asian flu
- H3N2 caused Hong Kong flu
- H5N1 is bird flu, endemic in avians
- H7N7 has unusual zoonotic potential
- H1N2 is currently endemic in humans and pigs
- H9N2, H7N2, H7N3, H10N7

H1N1

External images
- Microscopic image of the H1N1 virus
- Microscopic image of the H1N1 virus

H1N1 is currently endemic in both human and pig populations. A variant of H1N1 was responsible for the Spanish flu pandemic that killed some 50 million to 100 million people worldwide over about a year in 1918 and 1919. Controversy arose in October 2005, after the H1N1 genome was published in the journal, Science. Many fear that this information could be used for bioterrorism.

When he compared the 1918 virus with today's human flu viruses, Dr. Taubenberger noticed that it had alterations in just 25 to 30 of the virus's 4,400 amino acids. Those few changes turned a bird virus into a killer that could spread from person to person.

In mid-April 2009, an H1N1 variant appeared in Mexico, with its center in Mexico City. By 26 April the variant had spread widely; with cases reported in Canada, the US, New Zealand, the UK, France, Spain and Israel. On 29 April the WHO raised the worldwide pandemic phase to 5. On 11 June 2009 the WHO raised the worldwide pandemic phase to 6, which means that the H1N1 swine flu has reached pandemic proportions, with nearly 30,000 confirmed cases worldwide. A 13 November 2009 worldwide update by the WHO states that "206 countries and overseas territories/communities have officially reported over 503,536 laboratory confirmed cases of the influenza pandemic H1N1 infection, including 6,250 deaths."

H2N2

The Asian Flu was a pandemic outbreak of H2N2 avian influenza that originated in China in 1957, spread worldwide that same year during which an influenza vaccine was developed, lasted until 1958 and caused between one and four million deaths.

H3N2

H3N2 is currently endemic in both human and pig populations. It evolved from H2N2 by antigenic shift and caused the Hong Kong flu pandemic that killed up to 750,000."An early-onset, severe form of influenza A H3N2 made headlines when it claimed the lives of several children in the United States in late 2003."

The dominant strain of annual flu in January 2006 is H3N2. Measured resistance to the standard antiviral drugs amantadine and rimantadine in H3N2 has increased from 1% in 1994 to 12% in 2003 to 91% in 2005.

[C]ontemporary human H3N2 influenza viruses are now endemic in pigs in southern China and can reassort with avian H5N1 viruses in this intermediate host.

H7N7

H7N7 has unusual zoonotic potential. In 2003 in Netherlands 89 people were confirmed to have H7N7 influenza virus infection following an outbreak in poultry on several farms. One death was recorded.

H1N2

H1N2 is currently endemic in both human and pig populations. The new H1N2 strain appears to have resulted from the reassortment of the genes of the currently circulating influenza H1N1 and H3N2 subtypes. The hemagglutinin protein of the H1N2 virus is similar to that of the currently circulating H1N1 viruses and the neuraminidase protein is similar to that of the current H3N2 viruses.

=== Severity ===
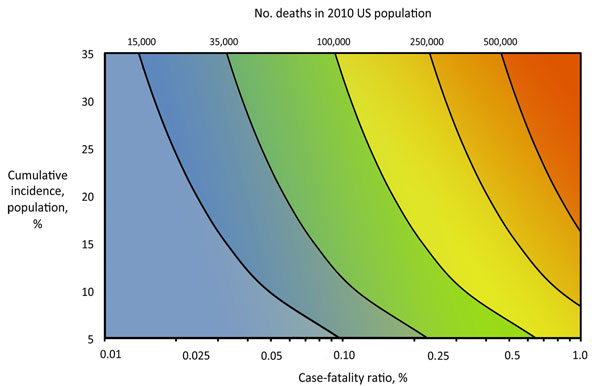
Estimates of hypothetical influenza deaths in the 2010 United States population (308,745,538 persons) across varying values of case-fatality ratio and the cumulative incidence of infection in the population. Selected estimated numbers of deaths are indicated with a black line, across each relevant combination of case-fatality ratio and cumulative incidence. In addition, the background color transitions from blue to yellow to red as the estimated absolute number of deaths increases. Case-fatality ratio is an example of a clinical severity measure and cumulative incidence of infection is an example of a transmissibility measure in the Pandemic Severity Assessment Framework.

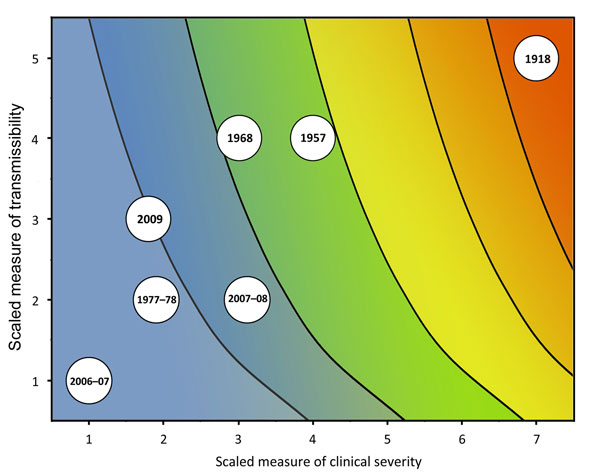
Scaled examples of past influenza pandemics and past influenza seasons. Color scheme included to represent corresponding hypothetical estimates of influenza deaths in the 2010 US population, with the same color scale as the previous figure.

In 2014, the CDC adopted the Pandemic Severity Assessment Framework (PSAF) to assess the severity of pandemics. The PSAF superseded the 2007 linear Pandemic Severity Index, which assumed 30% spread and measured case fatality rate (CFR) to assess the severity and evolution of the pandemic.

Historically, measures of pandemic severity were based on the case fatality rate. However, the case fatality rate might not be an adequate measure of pandemic severity during a pandemic response because:

- Deaths may lag several weeks behind cases, making the case fatality rate an underestimate
- The total number of cases may not be known, making the case fatality rate an overestimate
- A single case fatality rate for the entire population may obscure the effect on vulnerable sub-populations, such as children, the elderly, those with chronic conditions, and members of certain racial and ethnic minorities
- Fatalities alone may not account for the full effects of the pandemic, such as absenteeism or demand on healthcare services

To account for the limitations of measuring the case fatality rate alone, the PSAF rates severity of a disease outbreak on two dimensions: clinical severity of illness in infected persons; and the transmissibility of the infection in the population. Each dimension can be measured using more than one measure, which are scaled to allow comparison of the different measures.

== Management of a flu pandemic ==
=== Assessment ===
The World Health Organization (WHO) developed a global influenza preparedness plan, which defines the stages of a pandemic, outlines WHO's role and makes recommendations for national measures before and during a pandemic. This included a classification system for assessing the progress of an outbreak. Phases 1–3 correlate with preparedness, including capacity development and response planning activities, while phases 4–6 clearly signal the need for response and mitigation efforts. In February 2020, WHO announced that it no longer uses this six-phase classification model: "For the sake of clarification, WHO does not use the old system of 6 phases—that ranged from phase 1 (no reports of animal influenza causing human infections) to phase 6 (a pandemic)—that some people may be familiar with from H1N1 in 2009."

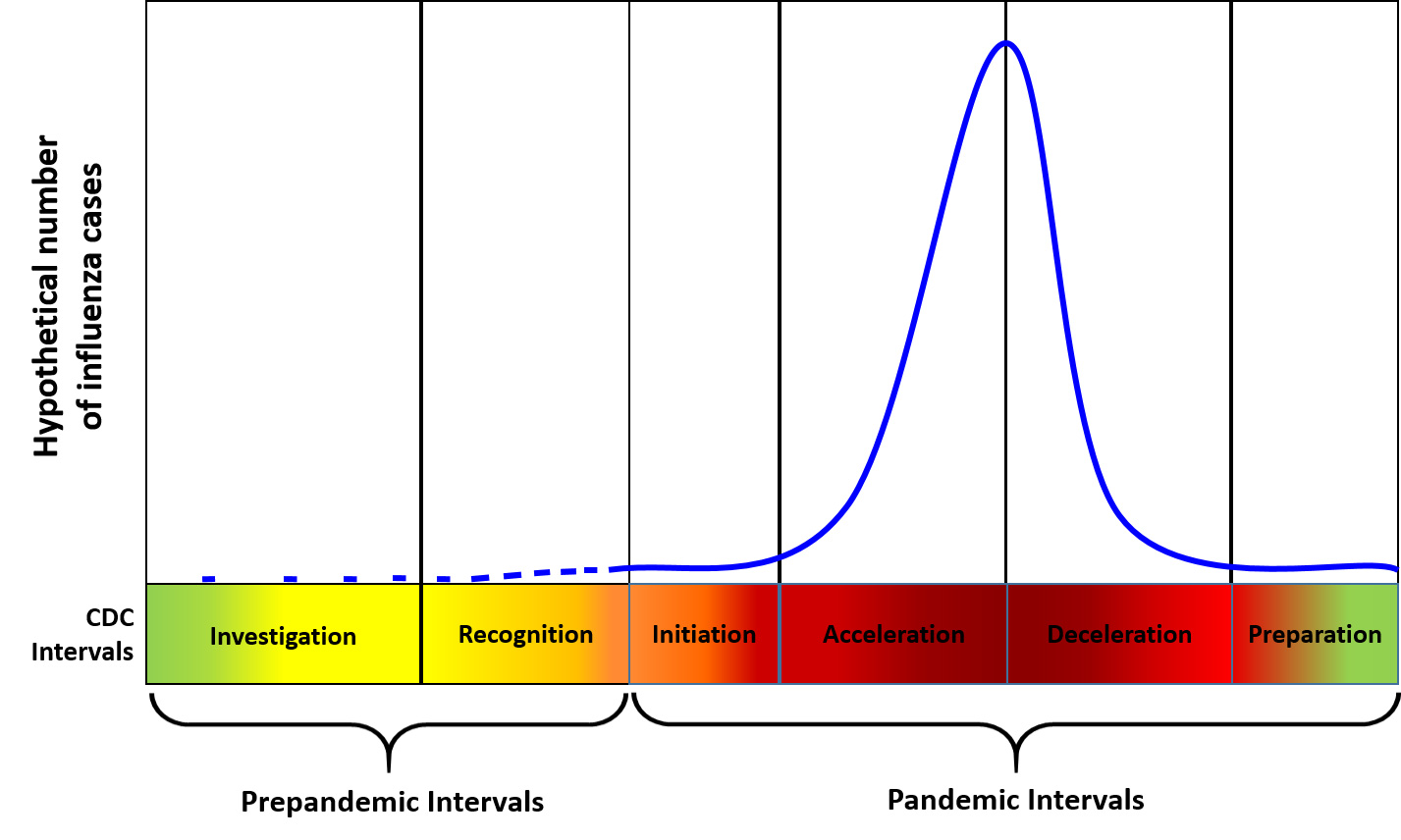
Influenza intervals in the CDC's Pandemic Intervals Framework

In 2014, the United States Centers for Disease Control and Prevention (CDC) introduced the Pandemic Intervals Framework for assessing influenza outbreaks. It includes two pre-pandemic intervals: -

- Investigation
- Recognition

and four pandemic intervals,

- Initiation
- Acceleration
- Deceleration
- Preparation

=== Strategies to prevent a flu pandemic ===
This section contains strategies to prevent a flu pandemic by a Council on Foreign Relations panel.

If influenza remains an animal problem with limited human-to-human transmission it is not a pandemic, though it continues to pose a risk. To prevent the situation from progressing to a pandemic, the following short-term strategies have been put forward:

- Culling and vaccinating livestock
- Vaccinating poultry workers against common flu
- Limiting travel in areas where the virus is found

The rationale for vaccinating poultry workers against common flu is that it reduces the probability of common influenza virus recombining with avian H5N1 virus to form a pandemic strain. Longer-term strategies proposed for regions where highly pathogenic H5N1 is endemic in wild birds have included:

- changing local farming practices to increase farm hygiene and reduce contact between livestock and wild birds.
- altering farming practices in regions where animals live in close, often unsanitary quarters with people, and changing the practices of open-air "wet markets" where birds are kept for live sale and slaughtered on-site. A challenge to implementing these measures is widespread poverty, frequently in rural areas, coupled with a reliance upon raising fowl for purposes of subsistence farming or income without measures to prevent propagation of the disease.
- changing local shopping practices from purchase of live fowl to purchase of slaughtered, pre-packaged fowl.
- improving veterinary vaccine availability and cost.

=== Strategies to slow down a flu pandemic ===
==== Public response measures ====
The main ways available to tackle a flu pandemic initially are behavioural. Doing so requires a good public health communication strategy and the ability to track public concerns, attitudes and behaviour. For example, the Flu TElephone Survey Template (FluTEST) was developed for the UK Department of Health as a set of questions for use in national surveys during a flu pandemic.

- Social distancing: By traveling less, implementing remote work, or closing schools, there is less opportunity for the virus to spread. Reduce the time spent in crowded settings if possible. And keep your distance (preferably at least 1 metre) from people who show symptoms of influenza-like illness, such as coughing and sneezing. However, social distancing during a pandemic flu will likely carry severe mental health consequences; therefore, sequestration protocols should take mental health issues into consideration.
- Respiratory hygiene: Advise people to cover their coughs and sneezes. If using a tissue, make sure you dispose of it carefully and then clean your hands immediately afterwards. (See "Handwashing Hygiene" below.) If you do not have a tissue handy when you cough or sneeze, cover your mouth as much as possible with the crook of your elbow.
- Handwashing hygiene: Frequent handwashing with soap and water (or with an alcohol-based hand sanitizer) is very important, especially after coughing or sneezing, and after contact with other people or with potentially contaminated surfaces (such as handrails, shared utensils, etc.)
- Other hygiene: Avoid touching your eyes, nose and mouth as much as possible.
- Masks: No mask can provide a perfect barrier, but products that meet or exceed the NIOSH N95 standard recommended by the World Health Organization are thought to provide good protection. WHO recommends that health-care workers wear N95 masks and that patients wear surgical masks (which may prevent respiratory secretions from becoming airborne). Any mask may be useful to remind the wearer not to touch the face. This can reduce infection due to contact with contaminated surfaces, especially in crowded public places where coughing or sneezing people have no way of washing their hands. The mask itself can become contaminated and must be handled as medical waste when removed.
- Risk communication: To encourage the public to comply with strategies to reduce the spread of disease, "communications regarding possible community interventions [such as requiring sick people to stay home from work, closing schools] for pandemic influenza that flow from the federal government to communities and from community leaders to the public not overstate the level of confidence or certainty in the effectiveness of these measures."

The Institute of Medicine has published a number of reports and summaries of workshops on public policy issues related to influenza pandemics. They are collected in Pandemic Influenza: A Guide to Recent Institute of Medicine Studies and Workshops, and some strategies from these reports are included in the list above. Relevant learning from the 2009 flu pandemic in the UK was published in Health Technology Assessment, volume 14, issue 34. Asymptomatic transmission appears to play a small role, but was not well studied by 2009.

==== Anti-viral drugs ====
There are two groups of antiviral drugs available for the treatment and prophylaxis of influenza: neuraminidase inhibitors such as Oseltamivir (trade name Tamiflu) and Zanamivir (trade name Relenza), and adamantanes such as amantadine and rimantadine. Due to the high rate of side effects and risk of antiviral resistance, use of adamantanes to fight influenza is limited.

Many nations, as well as the World Health Organization, are working to stockpile antiviral drugs in preparation for a possible pandemic. Oseltamivir is the most commonly sought drug, since it is available in pill form. Zanamivir is also considered for use, but it must be inhaled. Other anti-viral drugs are less likely to be effective against pandemic influenza.

Both Tamiflu and Relenza are in short supply, and production capabilities are limited in the medium term. Some doctors say that co-administration of Tamiflu with probenecid could double supplies.

There also is the potential of viruses to evolve drug resistance. Some H5N1-infected persons treated with oseltamivir have developed resistant strains of that virus.

==== Vaccines ====
A vaccine probably would not be available in the initial stages of population infection. To date, there is no known mechanism to develop a vaccine to protect against a virus which does not yet exist. The avian flu virus H5N1 has the potential to mutate into a pandemic strain, but so do other types of flu virus. Once a potential virus is identified and a vaccine is approved, it normally takes five to six months before the vaccine becomes available.

The capability to produce vaccines varies widely from country to country; only 19 countries are listed as "influenza vaccine manufacturers" according to the World Health Organization. It is estimated that, in a best scenario situation, 750 million doses could be produced each year, whereas it is likely that each individual would need two doses of the vaccine to become immuno-competent. Distribution to and inside countries would probably be problematic. Several countries, however, have well-developed plans for producing large quantities of vaccine. For example, Canadian health authorities say that they are developing the capacity to produce 32 million doses within four months, enough vaccine to inoculate every person in the country.

Another concern is whether countries which do not manufacture vaccines themselves, including those where a pandemic strain is likely to originate, will be able to purchase vaccine to protect their population. Cost considerations aside, they fear that the countries with vaccine-manufacturing capability will reserve production to protect their own populations and not release vaccines to other countries until their own population is protected. Indonesia has refused to share samples of H5N1 strains which have infected and killed its citizens until it receives assurances that it will have access to vaccines produced with those samples. So far, it has not received those assurances. However, in September 2009, Australia, Brazil, France, Italy, New Zealand, Norway, Switzerland, the UK, and the USA agreed to make 10 percent of their H1N1 vaccine supply available to less-developed countries.

There are two serious technical problems associated with the development of a vaccine against H5N1. The first problem is this: seasonal influenza vaccines require a single injection of 15 μg haemagluttinin in order to give protection; H5 seems to evoke only a weak immune response and a large multicentre trial found that two injections of 90 μg H5 given 28 days apart provided protection in only 54% of people. Even if it is considered that 54% is an acceptable level of protection, the world is currently capable of producing only 900 million doses at a strength of 15 μg (assuming that all production were immediately converted to manufacturing H5 vaccine); if two injections of 90 μg are needed then this capacity drops to only 70 million. Trials using adjuvants such as alum, AS03, AS04 or MF59 to try and lower the dose of vaccine are urgently needed. The second problem is this: there are two circulating clades of virus, clade 1 is the virus originally isolated in Vietnam, clade 2 is the virus isolated in Indonesia. Vaccine research has mostly been focused on clade 1 viruses, but the clade 2 virus is antigenically distinct and a clade 1 vaccine will probably not protect against a pandemic caused by clade 2 virus.

Since 2009, most vaccine development efforts have been focused on the current pandemic influenza virus H1N1. As of July 2009, more than 70 known clinical trials have been completed or are ongoing for pandemic influenza vaccines. In September 2009, the US Food and Drug Administration approved four vaccines against the 2009 H1N1 influenza virus, and expected the initial vaccine lots to be available within the following month.

== Government preparations for a potential H5N1 pandemic (2003–2009) ==
According to The New York Times as of March 2006, "governments worldwide have spent billions planning for a potential influenza pandemic: buying medicines, running disaster drills, [and] developing strategies for tighter border controls" due to the H5N1 threat.

[T]he United States is collaborating closely with eight international organizations, including the World Health Organization (WHO), the Food and Agriculture Organization of the United Nations (FAO), the World Organization for Animal Health (OIE), and 88 foreign governments to address the situation through planning, greater monitoring, and full transparency in reporting and investigating avian influenza occurrences. The United States and these international partners have led global efforts to encourage countries to heighten surveillance for outbreaks in poultry and significant numbers of deaths in migratory birds and to rapidly introduce containment measures. The U.S. Agency for International Development (USAID) and the U.S. Departments of State, Health and Human Services (HHS), and Agriculture (USDA) are coordinating future international response measures on behalf of the White House with departments and agencies across the federal government.

Together steps are being taken to "minimize the risk of further spread in animal populations", "reduce the risk of human infections", and "further support pandemic planning and preparedness".

=== United Nations ===
In September 2005, David Nabarro, a lead UN health official, warned that a bird flu outbreak could happen at any time and had the potential to kill 5–150 million people.

=== World Health Organization ===
The World Health Organization (WHO), believing that the world was closer to another influenza pandemic than it has been any time since 1968, when the last of the 20th century's three pandemics swept the globe, has developed guidelines on pandemic influenza preparedness and response. The March 2005 plan includes guidance on roles and responsibilities in preparedness and response; information on pandemic phases; and recommended actions for before, during, and after a pandemic.

=== United States ===
"[E]fforts by the federal government to prepare for pandemic influenza at the national level include a $100 million DHHS initiative in 2003 to build U.S. vaccine production. Several agencies within Department of Health and Human Services (DHHS)—including the Office of the Secretary, the Food and Drug Administration (FDA), CDC, and the National Institute of Allergy and Infectious Diseases (NIAID)—are in the process of working with vaccine manufacturers to facilitate production of pilot vaccine lots for both H5N1 and H9N2 strains as well as contracting for the manufacturing of 2 million doses of an H5N1 vaccine. This H5N1 vaccine production will provide a critical pilot test of the pandemic vaccine system; it will also be used for clinical trials to evaluate dose and immunogenicity and can provide initial vaccine for early use in the event of an emerging pandemic."

Each state and territory of the United States has a specific pandemic flu plan which covers avian flu, swine flu (H1N1), and other potential influenza epidemics. The state plans together with a professionally vetted search engine of flu related research, policies, and plans, is available at the current portal: Pandemic Flu Search.

On 26 August 2004, Secretary of Health and Human Services, Tommy Thompson released a draft Pandemic Influenza Response and Preparedness Plan, which outlined a coordinated national strategy to prepare for and respond to an influenza pandemic. Public comments were accepted for 60 days.

In a speech before the United Nations General Assembly on 14 September 2005, President George W. Bush announced the creation of the International Partnership on Avian and Pandemic Influenza. The Partnership brings together nations and international organizations to improve global readiness by:

- elevating the issue on national agendas;
- coordinating efforts among donor and affected nations;
- mobilizing and leveraging resources;
- increasing transparency in disease reporting and surveillance; and
- building capacity to identify, contain and respond to a pandemic influenza.

On 5 October 2005, Democratic Senators Harry Reid, Evan Bayh, Dick Durbin, Ted Kennedy, Barack Obama, and Tom Harkin introduced the Pandemic Preparedness and Response Act as a proposal to deal with a possible outbreak.

On 27 October 2005, the Department of Health and Human Services awarded a $62.5 million contract to Chiron Corporation to manufacture an avian influenza vaccine designed to protect against the H5N1 influenza virus strain. This followed a previous awarded $100 million contract to Sanofi Pasteur, the vaccines business of Sanofi, for avian flu vaccine.

In October 2005, Bush urged bird flu vaccine manufacturers to increase their production.

On 1 November 2005, Bush unveiled the National Strategy To Safeguard Against The Danger of Pandemic Influenza. He also submitted a request to Congress for $7.1 billion to begin implementing the plan. The request includes $251 million to detect and contain outbreaks before they spread around the world; $2.8 billion to accelerate development of cell-culture technology; $800 million for development of new treatments and vaccines; $1.519 billion for the Departments of Health and Human Services (HHS) and Defense to purchase influenza vaccines; $1.029 billion to stockpile antiviral medications; and $644 million to ensure that all levels of government are prepared to respond to a pandemic outbreak.

On 6 March 2006, Mike Leavitt, Secretary of Health and Human Services, said U.S. health agencies are continuing to develop vaccine alternatives that will protect against the evolving avian influenza virus.

The U.S. government, bracing for the possibility that migrating birds could carry a deadly strain of bird flu to North America, plans to test nearly eight times as many wild birds starting in April 2006 as have been tested in the past decade.

On 8 March 2006, Dr. David Nabarro, senior UN coordinator for avian and human influenza, said that given the flight patterns of wild birds that have been spreading avian influenza (bird flu) from Asia to Europe and Africa, birds infected with the H5N1 virus could reach the Americas within the next six to 12 months.

July 5, 2006, (CIDRAP News) – "In an update on pandemic influenza preparedness efforts, the federal government said last week it had stockpiled enough vaccine against H5N1 avian influenza virus to inoculate about 4 million people and enough antiviral medication to treat about 6.3 million."

=== Canada ===
The Public Health Agency of Canada follows the WHO's categories, but has expanded them. The avian flu scare of 2006 prompted The Canadian Public Health Agency to release an updated Pandemic Influenza Plan for Health Officials. This document was created to address the growing concern over the hazards faced by public health officials when exposed to sick or dying patients.

=== Malaysia ===
Since the Nipah virus outbreak in 1999, the Malaysian Health Ministry have put in place processes to be better prepared to protect the Malaysian population from the threat of infectious diseases. Malaysia was fully prepared during the severe acute respiratory syndrome (SARS) situation (Malaysia was not a SARS-affected country) and the episode of the H5N1 outbreak in 2004.

The Malaysian government has developed a National Influenza Pandemic Preparedness Plan (NIPPP), which serves as "a time bound guide for preparedness and [a] response plan for influenza pandemic". According to the Director-General of Health Malaysia, the plan "provides a policy and strategic framework for a multisectoral response", offering "specific advice and actions to be undertaken by the Ministry of Health at the different levels, other governmental departments and agencies and non-governmental organizations to ensure that resources are mobilized and used most efficiently before, during and after a pandemic episode".

== See also ==
- Bibliography of the history of the 1918 influenza pandemic
- Timeline of influenza
- List of epidemics
