= Pandemic severity index =

Proposed measure of the severity of influenza

The pandemic severity index (PSI) was a proposed classification scale for reporting the severity of influenza pandemics in the United States. The PSI was accompanied by a set of guidelines intended to help communicate appropriate actions for communities to follow in potential pandemic situations. Released by the United States Department of Health and Human Services (HHS) on February 1, 2007, the PSI was designed to resemble the Saffir-Simpson Hurricane Scale classification scheme. The index was replaced by the Pandemic Severity Assessment Framework in 2014, which uses quadrants based on transmissibility and clinical severity rather than a linear scale.

== Development ==
The PSI was developed by the Centers for Disease Control and Prevention (CDC) as a new pandemic influenza planning tool for use by states, communities, businesses and schools, as part of a drive to provide more specific community-level prevention measures. Although designed for domestic implementation, the HHS has not ruled out sharing the index and guidelines with interested international parties.

The index and guidelines were developed by applying principles of epidemiology to data from the history of the last three major flu pandemics and seasonal flu transmission, mathematical models, and input from experts and citizen focus groups. Many "tried and true" practices were combined in a more structured manner:

We also realize as we look back through history is what cities did – 44 cities did, is that many of these measures ultimately every city adopted at some point or another, and the difference may be in the timing of using these measures and whether they're coordinated in an effective way for us to really gain the benefits of them.

— Martin Cetron, Director of CDC's Division of Global Migration and Quarantine

== Context ==
During the onset of a growing pandemic, local communities cannot rely upon widespread availability of antiviral drugs and vaccines (See Influenza research). The goal of the index is to provide guidance as to what measures various organizations can enact that will slow down the progression of a pandemic, easing the burden of stress upon community resources while definite solutions, like drugs and vaccines, can be brought to bear on the situation. The CDC expects adoption of the PSI will allow early co-ordinated use of community mitigation measures to affect pandemic progression.

== Guidelines ==
The index focuses less on how likely a disease will spread worldwide – that is, become a pandemic – and more upon how severe the epidemic actually is. The main criterion used to measure pandemic severity will be case-fatality rate (CFR), the percentage of deaths out of the total reported cases of the disease.The actual implementation of PSI alerts was expected to occur after the World Health Organization (WHO) announces phase 6 influenza transmission (human to human) in the United States. This would probably result in immediate announcement of a PSI level 3–4 situation.

The analogy of "category" levels were introduced to provide an understandable connection to hurricane classification schemes, with specific reference to the aftermath of Hurricane Katrina. Like the Saffir–Simpson Hurricane Scale, the PSI ranges from 1 to 5, with Category 1 pandemics being most mild (equivalent to seasonal flu) and level 5 being reserved for the most severe "worst-case" scenario pandemics (such as the 1918 Spanish flu).

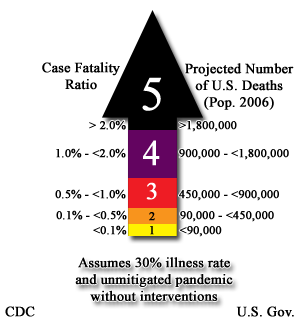
A graphical representation of the PSI categorization scheme

CDC Pandemic Severity Index chart
Category	Case fatality rate	Example(s)
1	Less than 0.1%	Seasonal flu and 2009 swine flu
2	0.1–0.5%	Asian flu and Hong Kong flu
3	0.5–1.0%	
4	1.0–2.0%	
5	2.0% or higher	1918 influenza pandemic

The report recommends four primary social distancing measures for slowing down a pandemic:

- Isolation and treatment of people who have suspected or confirmed cases of pandemic influenza
- Voluntary home quarantine of household contacts of those with suspected or confirmed pandemic influenza
- Dismissing school classes and closing daycare centers
- Changing work schedules and canceling large public gatherings

These actions, when implemented, can have an overall effect of reducing the number of new cases of the disease; but they can carry potentially adverse consequences in terms of community and social disruption. The measures should have the most noticeable impact if implemented uniformly by organizations and governments across the US.

== Response ==
While unveiling the PSI, Dr. Martin Cetron, Director for the Division of Global Migration and Quarantine at the CDC, reported that early feedback to the idea of a pandemic classification scale has been "uniformly positive".

The University of Minnesota's Center for Infectious Disease Research and Policy (CIDRAP) reports that the PSI has been "drawing generally high marks from public health officials and others, but they say the plan spells a massive workload for local planners". One MD praised that the PSI were "a big improvement over the previous guidance"; while historical influenza expert and author John M. Barry was more critical of the PSI, saying not enough emphasis was placed on basic health principles that could have an impact at the community level, adding "I'd feel a lot more comfortable with a lot more research [supporting them]".

During the initial press releases in 2007, the CDC acknowledge that the PSI and the accompanying guidelines were a work in progress and will likely undergo revision in the months following their release.

In 2014, after the 2009 swine flu pandemic, the PSI was replaced by the Pandemic Severity Assessment Framework, which uses quadrants based on transmissibility and clinical severity rather than a linear scale.

== See also ==
- Pandemic Severity Assessment Framework
- 2009 H1N1 influenza pandemic
- Early Warning and Response System
- WHO pandemic phases
