= Influenza A virus subtype H7N7 =

Virus classification
- (unranked): Virus
- Realm: Riboviria
- Kingdom: Orthornavirae
- Phylum: Negarnaviricota
- Class: Insthoviricetes
- Order: Articulavirales
- Family: Orthomyxoviridae
- Genus: Alphainfluenzavirus
- Species: Influenza A virus
- Serotype: Influenza A virus subtype H7N7

Virus subtype

Influenza A virus subtype H7N7 (A/H7N7) is a subtype of Influenza A virus, a genus of Orthomyxovirus, the viruses responsible for influenza. Highly pathogenic strains (HPAI) and low pathogenic strains (LPAI) exist. H7N7 can infect humans, birds, pigs, seals, and horses in the wild; and has infected mice in laboratory studies. This unusual zoonotic potential represents a pandemic threat.

In 2003, 89 people in the Netherlands were confirmed to have been infected by H7N7 following an outbreak in poultry on approximately 255 farms. One death was recorded – a veterinarian who had been testing chickens for the virus – and all infected flocks were culled. Most affected people had mild symptoms including conjunctivitis. Antibodies were found in over half of 500 people tested according to the final official report by the Dutch government:

As at least 50% of the people exposed to infected poultry had H7 antibodies detectable with the modified assay, it was estimated that avian influenza A/H7N7 virus infection occurred in at least 1000, and perhaps as many as 2000 people. The seroprevalence of H7 antibodies in people without contact with infected poultry, but with close household contact with an infected poultry worker, was 59%. This suggests that the population at risk for avian influenza was not limited to those with direct contact with infected poultry, and that person to person transmission may have occurred on a large scale. Final analysis of Dutch avian influenza outbreaks reveals much higher levels of transmission to humans than previously thought.

In August 2006, low pathogenic (LP) H7N7 was found during routine testing at a poultry farm in Voorthuizen in the central Netherlands. As a precautionary measure, 25,000 chickens were culled from Voorthuizen and surrounding farms.

In June 2008, high pathogenic (HP) H7N7 was confirmed on a 25,000-bird laying unit at Shenington, England; probably derived from a pre-existing low pathogenic variety. Farmers Guardian reported a 2.5 per cent increased mortality in one shed and a reduction in egg production recorded two weeks before numerous deaths on 2 June that led to the diagnosis of HP H7N7 on 4 June.

In October 2009, high pathogenic (HP) H7N7 was confirmed on a farm in Almoguera, Guadalajara, Spain. Hong Kong announced that it would suspend the import of poultry from Spain.

In August 2013, high pathogenic (HP) H7N7 was found in markets in Wenzhou, Zhejiang province in China when testing for H7N9.

In July 2015, high pathogenic (HP) H7N7 was confirmed on a poultry farm in Lancashire, England.

In August 2020, H7N7 was confirmed on a free range farm in Lethbridge, Victoria.
