= Pandemic =

Widespread, often global, epidemic of severe infectious disease

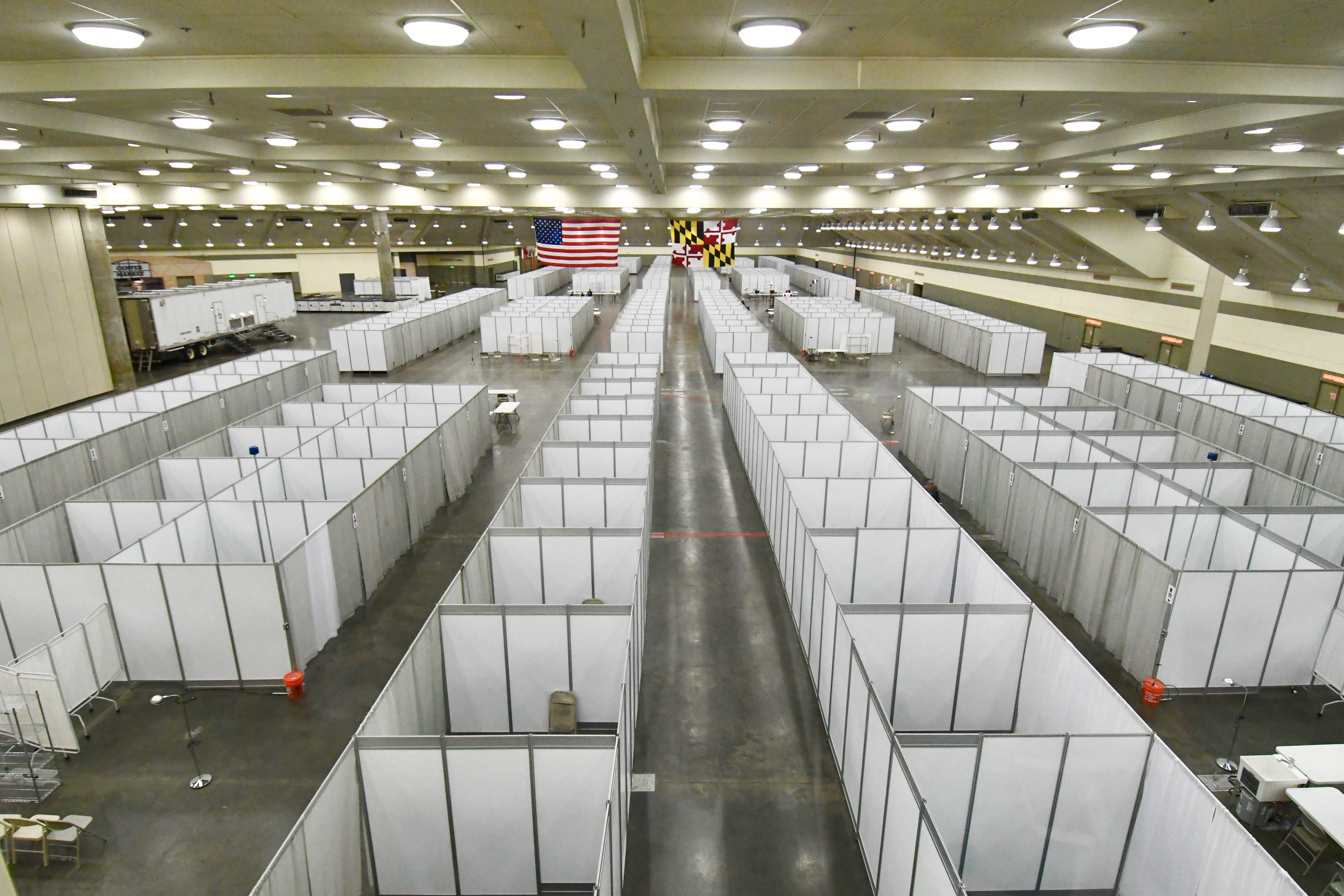
Early in the COVID-19 pandemic, convention centers (pictured here) were deemed to be ideal sites for temporary hospitals, due to their existing infrastructure (electrical, water, sewage). Hotels and dormitories were also considered appropriate because they can use negative pressure technology.

A pandemic (/pænˈdɛmɪk/ pan-DEM-ik) is an epidemic of an infectious disease that has a sudden increase in cases and spreads across a large region, for instance multiple continents or worldwide, affecting a substantial portion of the human population. Widespread endemic diseases with a stable number of infected individuals such as recurrences of seasonal influenza are generally excluded as they occur simultaneously in large regions of the globe rather than being spread worldwide.

Throughout human history, there have been a number of pandemics of diseases such as smallpox. The Black Death, caused by the Plague, caused the deaths of up to half of the population of Europe in the 14th century. The term pandemic had not been used then, but was used for later epidemics, including the 1918 H1N1 influenza A pandemic—more commonly known as the Spanish flu—which is the deadliest pandemic in history. The most recent pandemics include the HIV/AIDS pandemic, (Note: Most medical sources, including the WHO, do not refer to HIV/AIDS as a pandemic; those that do refer to it in the past-tense to separate the acute and chronic phases.) the 2009 swine flu pandemic and the COVID-19 pandemic. Almost all these diseases still circulate among humans though their impact now is often far less.

In response to the COVID-19 pandemic, 194 member states of the World Health Organization began negotiations on an International Treaty on Pandemic Prevention, Preparedness and Response, with a requirement to submit a draft of this treaty to the 77th World Health Assembly during its 2024 convention. The WHO Pandemic Agreement was adopted at the World Health Assembly in May 2025, establishing rules on how countries should act and collaborate to prevent, prepare for and respond to pandemic emergencies and public health emergencies of international concern. It was approved with 120 votes in favour, 70 abstentions and the absence of the United States, which had already withdrawn from the WHO.

== Definition ==
Depiction of the burial of bodies during the Black Death, which killed up to half of Eurasia's population in the 14th century.

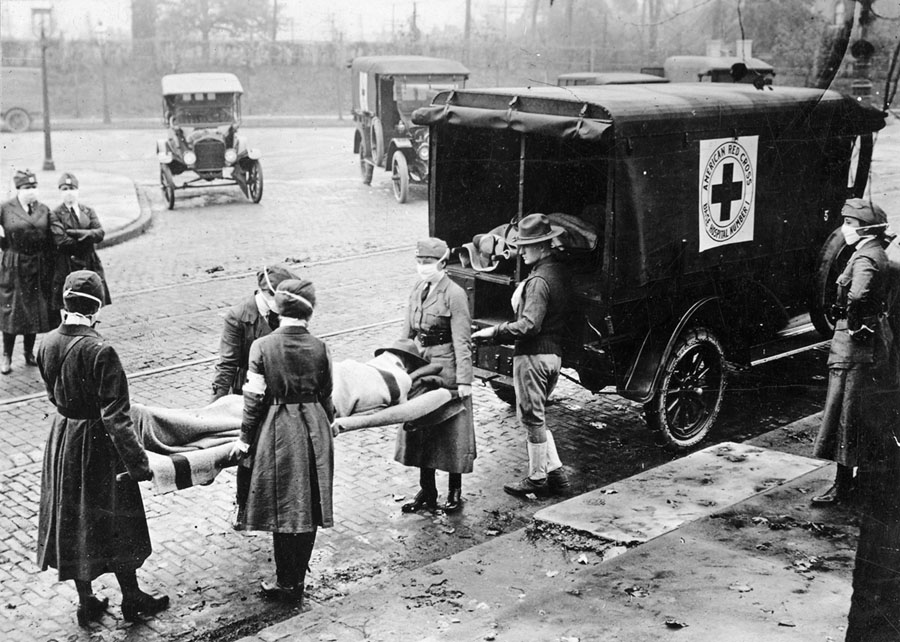
American Red Cross workers carry a body during the 1918–20 "Spanish flu" pandemic.

The word comes from the Ancient Greek παν- pan- meaning 'all, every', and δῆμος demos 'people', hence "common to all the people" cf. Aphrodite Pandemos. The term survives until today in Modern Greek with the meaning "all-people's" or "concerning all the people" i.e. "a pandemic assembly".

A medical dictionary definition of pandemic is "an epidemic occurring on a scale that crosses international boundaries, usually affecting people on a worldwide scale". A disease or condition is not a pandemic merely because it is widespread or kills many people; it must also be infectious. For instance, cancer is responsible for many deaths but is not considered a pandemic because the disease is not contagious—i.e. easily transmissible—and not even simply infectious. This definition differs from colloquial usage in that it encompasses outbreaks of relatively mild diseases.

The equivalent term for a disease widely affecting non-human animals is panzootic.

The World Health Organization (WHO) has a category of Public Health Emergency of International Concern, defined as "an extraordinary event which is determined to constitute a public health risk to other States through the international spread of disease and to potentially require a coordinated international response". There is a rigorous process underlying this categorization and a clearly defined trajectory of responses.

A WHO-sponsored international body, tasked with preparing an international agreement on pandemic prevention, preparedness and response has defined a pandemic as "the global spread of a pathogen or variant that infects human populations with limited or no immunity through sustained and high transmissibility from person to person, overwhelming health systems with severe morbidity and high mortality, and causing social and economic disruptions, all of which require effective national and global collaboration and coordination for its control".

=== Parameters ===
A common early characteristic of a pandemic is a rapid, sometimes exponential, growth in the number of infections, coupled with a widening geographical spread.

WHO utilises different criteria to declare a Public Health Emergency of International Concern (PHEIC), its nearest equivalent to the term pandemic. The potential consequences of an incident are considered, rather than its current status. For example, polio was declared a PHEIC in 2014 even though only 482 cases were reported globally in the previous year; this was justified by concerns that polio might break out of its endemic areas and again become a significant health threat globally. The PHEIC status of polio is reviewed regularly and is ongoing, despite the small number of cases annually. (Note: As of August 2023)

The end of a pandemic is more difficult to delineate. Generally, past epidemics and pandemics have faded out as the diseases become accepted into people's daily lives and routines, becoming endemic. The transition from pandemic to endemic may be defined based on:

- a high proportion of the global population having immunity (through either natural infection or vaccination)
- fewer deaths
- health systems step down from emergency status
- perceived personal risk is lessened
- restrictive measures such as travel restrictions removed
- less coverage in public media.

An endemic disease is always present in a population, but at a relatively low and predictable level. There may be periodic spikes of infections or seasonality, (e.g. influenza) but generally the burden on health systems is manageable.

== Prevention and preparedness ==
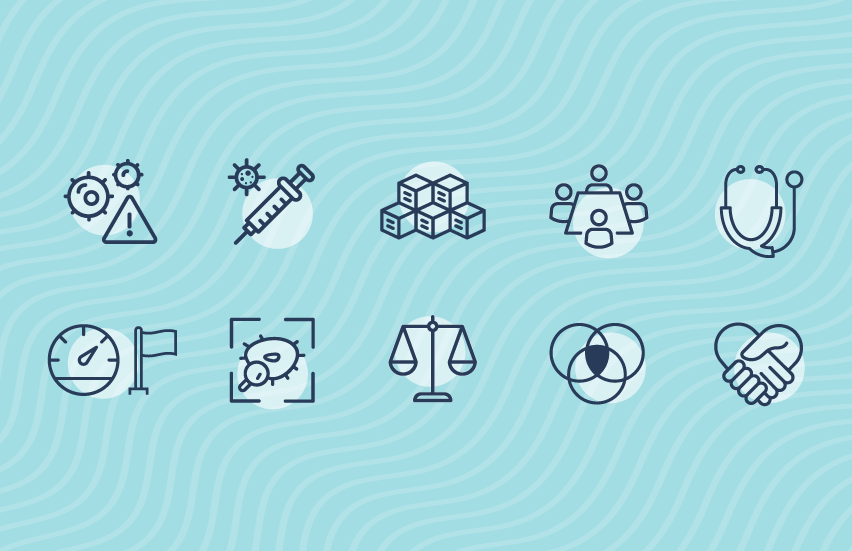
Infographic illustrating the benefits of a treaty for pandemic prevention

Pandemic prevention comprises activities such as anticipatory research and development of therapies and vaccines, as well as monitoring for pathogens and disease outbreaks which may have pandemic potential. Routine vaccination programs are a type of prevention strategy, holding back diseases such as influenza and polio which have caused pandemics in the past, and could do so again if not controlled. Prevention overlaps with preparedness which aims to curtail an outbreak and prevent it getting out of control - it involves strategic planning, data collection and modelling to measure the spread, stockpiling of therapies, vaccines, and medical equipment, as well as public health awareness campaigning. By definition, a pandemic involves many countries so international cooperation, data sharing, and collaboration are essential; as is universal access to tests and therapies.

Collaboration – In response to the COVID-19 pandemic, WHO established a Pandemic Hub in September 2021 in Berlin, aiming to address weaknesses around the world in how countries detect, monitor and manage public health threats. The Hub's initiatives include using artificial intelligence to analyse more than 35,000 data feeds for indications of emerging health threats, as well as improving facilities and coordination between academic institutions and WHO member countries.

Detection – In May 2023, WHO launched the International Pathogen Surveillance Network (IPSN) (hosted by the Pandemic Hub) aiming to detect and respond to disease threats before they become epidemics and pandemics, and to optimize routine disease surveillance. The network provides a platform to connect countries, improving systems for collecting and analysing samples of potentially harmful pathogens. Wastewater surveillance can for example provide early warnings by detecting pathogens in sewage.

Therapies and vaccines – The Coalition for Epidemic Preparedness Innovations (CEPI) is developing a program as part of their 2022–2026 pandemic plan to condense new vaccine development timelines to 100 days, less than a third of the time it took to develop a COVID-19 vaccine. In the US, the National Institute of Allergy and Infectious Diseases (NIAID) has developed a Pandemic Preparedness Plan which focuses on identifying viruses of concern and developing diagnostics and therapies (including prototype vaccines) to combat them.

Modeling is important to inform policy decisions. It helps to predict the burden of disease on healthcare facilities, the effectiveness of control measures, projected geographical spread, and timing and extent of future pandemic waves.

Public awareness involves disseminating reliable information, ensuring consistency in message, transparency, and steps to discredit misinformation.

Air quality – Enhanced indoor ventilation and air filtration systems are also effective at reducing transmission of airborne pathogens, while providing additional health benefits beyond pandemic control.

Stockpiling involves maintaining strategic stockpiles of emergency supplies such as personal protective equipment, drugs and vaccines, and equipment such as respirators. Many of these items have limited shelf life, so they require stock rotation even though they may be rarely used.

=== Ethical and political issues ===
The COVID-19 pandemic highlighted a number of ethical and political issues which must be considered during a pandemic. These included decisions about who should be prioritised for treatment while resources are scarce; whether or not to make vaccination compulsory; the timing and extent of constraints on individual liberty, how to sanction individuals who do not comply with emergency regulations, and the extent of international collaboration and resource sharing.

== Pandemic management strategies ==
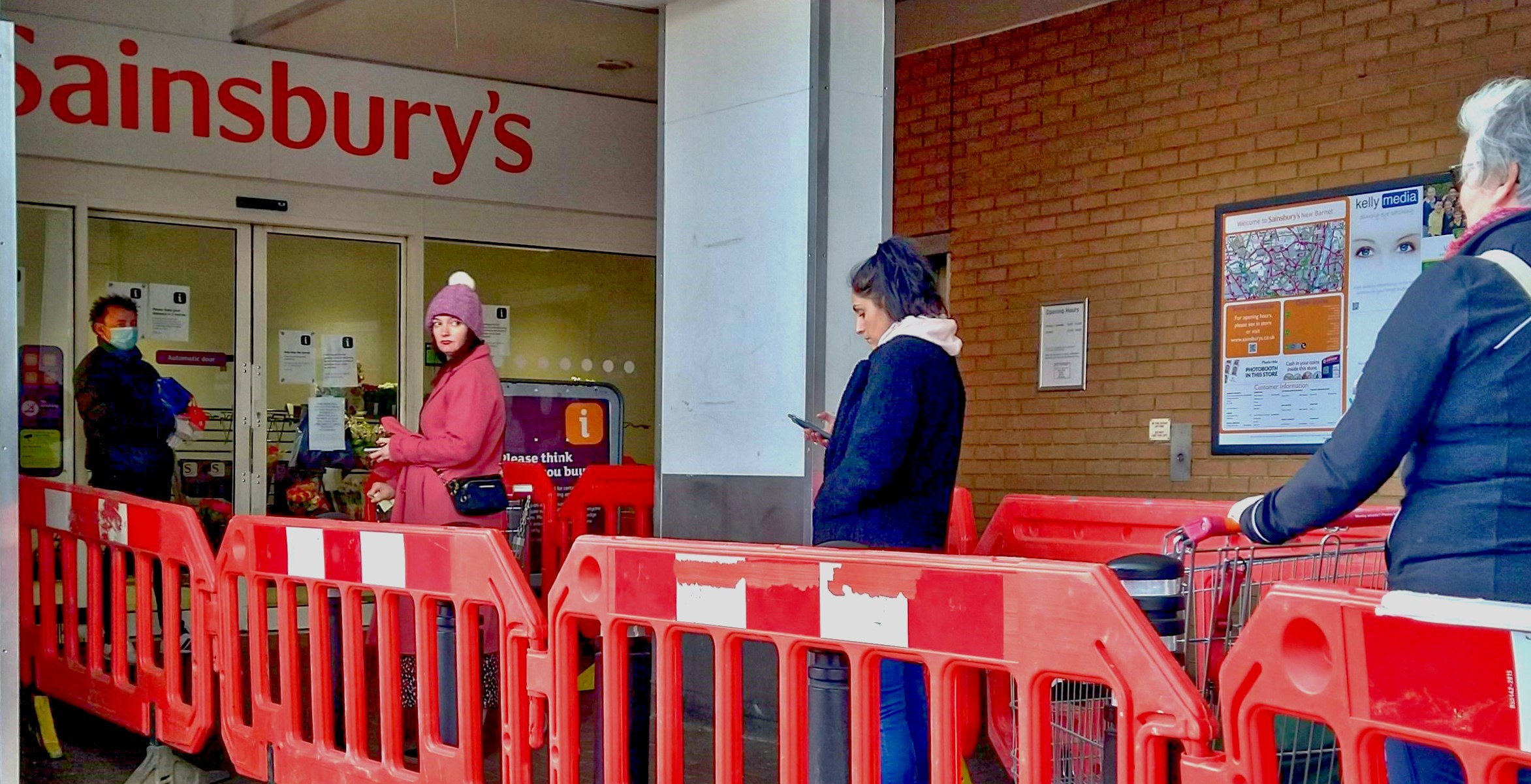
Social distancing in public

Goals of mitigation include delaying and reducing peak burden on healthcare (flattening the curve) and lessening overall cases and health impact. Also, increasing healthcare capacity (raising the line, as by increasing bed count, personnel, and equipment) helps to meet increased demand.

Mitigation attempts that are inadequate in strictness or duration—such as premature relaxation of physical distancing rules or stay-at-home orders—can allow a resurgence after the initial surge and mitigation.

Without pandemic containment measures—such as social distancing, vaccination, and use of face masks—pathogens can spread exponentially. This graphic shows how early adoption of containment measures tends to protect wider swaths of the population.

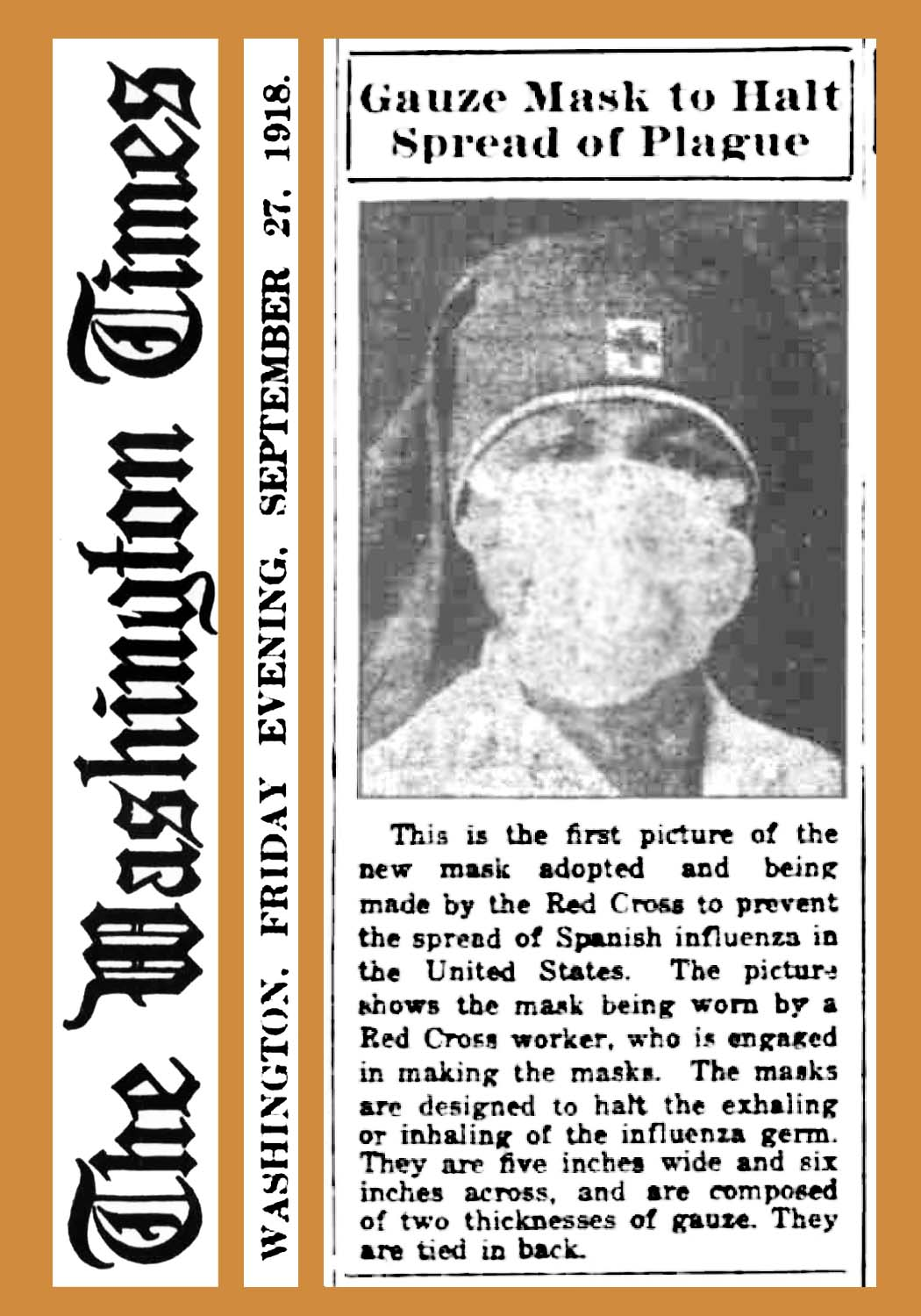
The Red Cross recommended two-layer gauze masks to contain the Spanish flu (1918).

The basic strategies in the control of an outbreak are containment and mitigation. Containment may be undertaken in the early stages of the outbreak, including contact tracing and isolating infected individuals to stop the disease from spreading to the rest of the population, other public health interventions on infection control, and therapeutic countermeasures such as vaccinations which may be effective if available. When it becomes apparent that it is no longer possible to contain the spread of the disease, management will then move on to the mitigation stage, in which measures are taken to slow the spread of the disease and mitigate its effects on society and the healthcare system. In reality, containment and mitigation measures may be undertaken simultaneously.

A key part of managing an infectious disease outbreak is trying to decrease the epidemic peak, known as "flattening the curve". This helps decrease the risk of health services being overwhelmed and provides more time for a vaccine and treatment to be developed. A broad group of non-pharmaceutical interventions may be taken to manage the outbreak. In a flu pandemic, these actions may include personal preventive measures such as hand hygiene, wearing face-masks, and self-quarantine; community measures aimed at social distancing such as closing schools and canceling mass gatherings; community engagement to encourage acceptance and participation in such interventions; and environmental measures such as cleaning of surfaces.

Another strategy, suppression, requires more extreme long-term non-pharmaceutical interventions to reverse the pandemic by reducing the basic reproduction number to less than 1. The suppression strategy, which includes stringent population-wide social distancing, home isolation of cases, and household quarantine, was undertaken by China during the COVID-19 pandemic where entire cities were placed under lockdown; such a strategy may carry with it considerable social and economic costs.

== Frameworks for influenza pandemics ==
=== WHO system ===
For a novel influenza virus, WHO previously applied a six-stage classification to delineate the process by which the virus moves from the first few infections in humans through to a pandemic. Starting with phase 1 (infections identified in animals only), it moves through phases of increasing infection and spread to phase 6 (pandemic). In February 2020, a WHO spokesperson clarified that the system is no longer in use.

=== CDC Frameworks ===
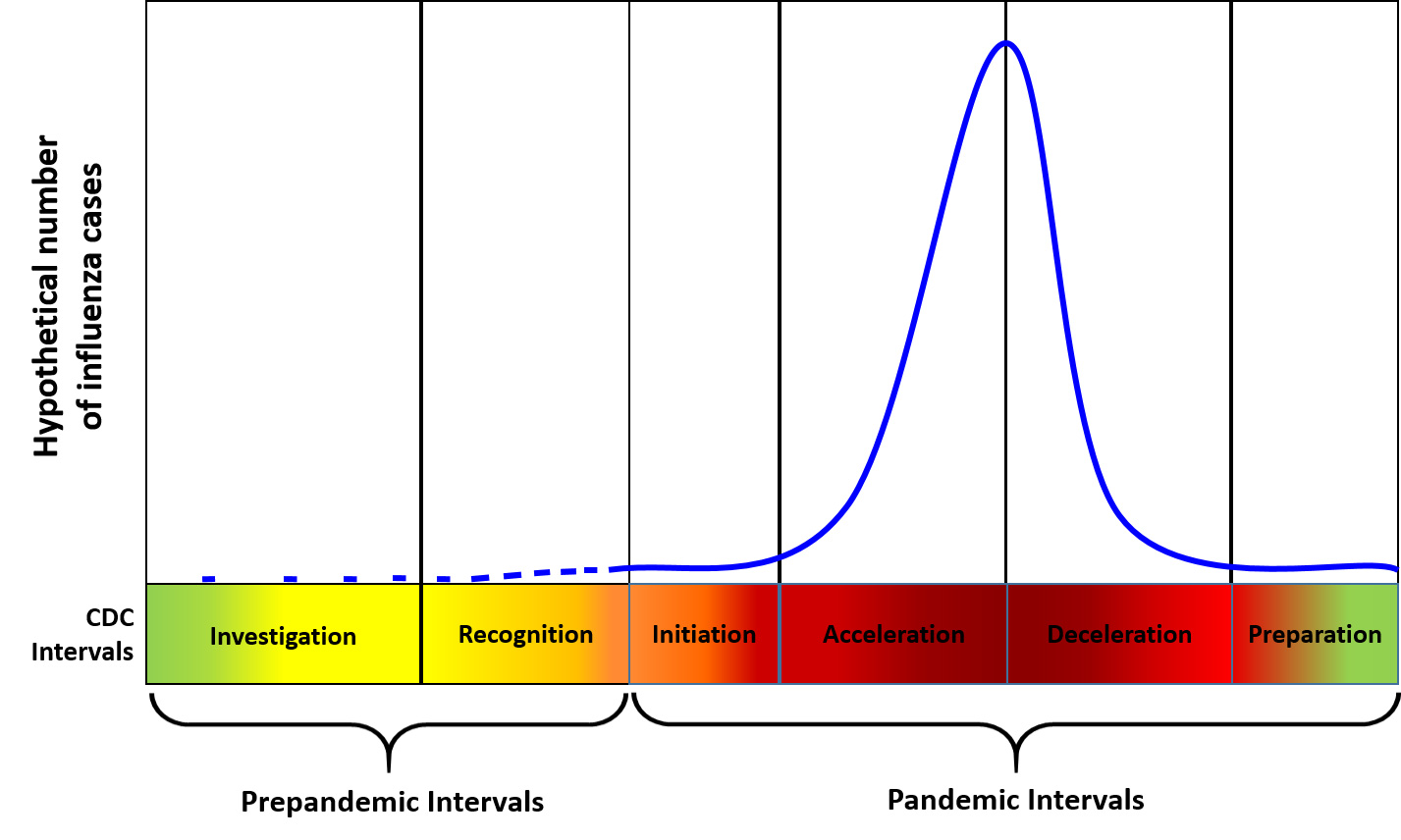
Influenza intervals in the CDC's Pandemic Intervals Framework

In 2014, the United States Centers for Disease Control and Prevention (CDC) introduced a framework for characterising the progress of an influenza pandemic titled the Pandemic Intervals Framework. The six intervals of the framework are as follows:

- investigation of cases of novel influenza,
- recognition of increased potential for ongoing transmission,
- initiation of a pandemic wave,
- acceleration of a pandemic wave,
- deceleration of a pandemic wave, and
- preparation for future pandemic waves.

At the same time, the CDC adopted the Pandemic Severity Assessment Framework (PSAF) to assess the severity of influenza pandemics. The PSAF rates the severity of an influenza outbreak on two dimensions: clinical severity of illness in infected persons; and the transmissibility of the infection in the population. This tool was not applied during the COVID-19 pandemic.

== Notable pandemics and outbreaks ==
=== Recent outbreaks ===
==== COVID-19 ====
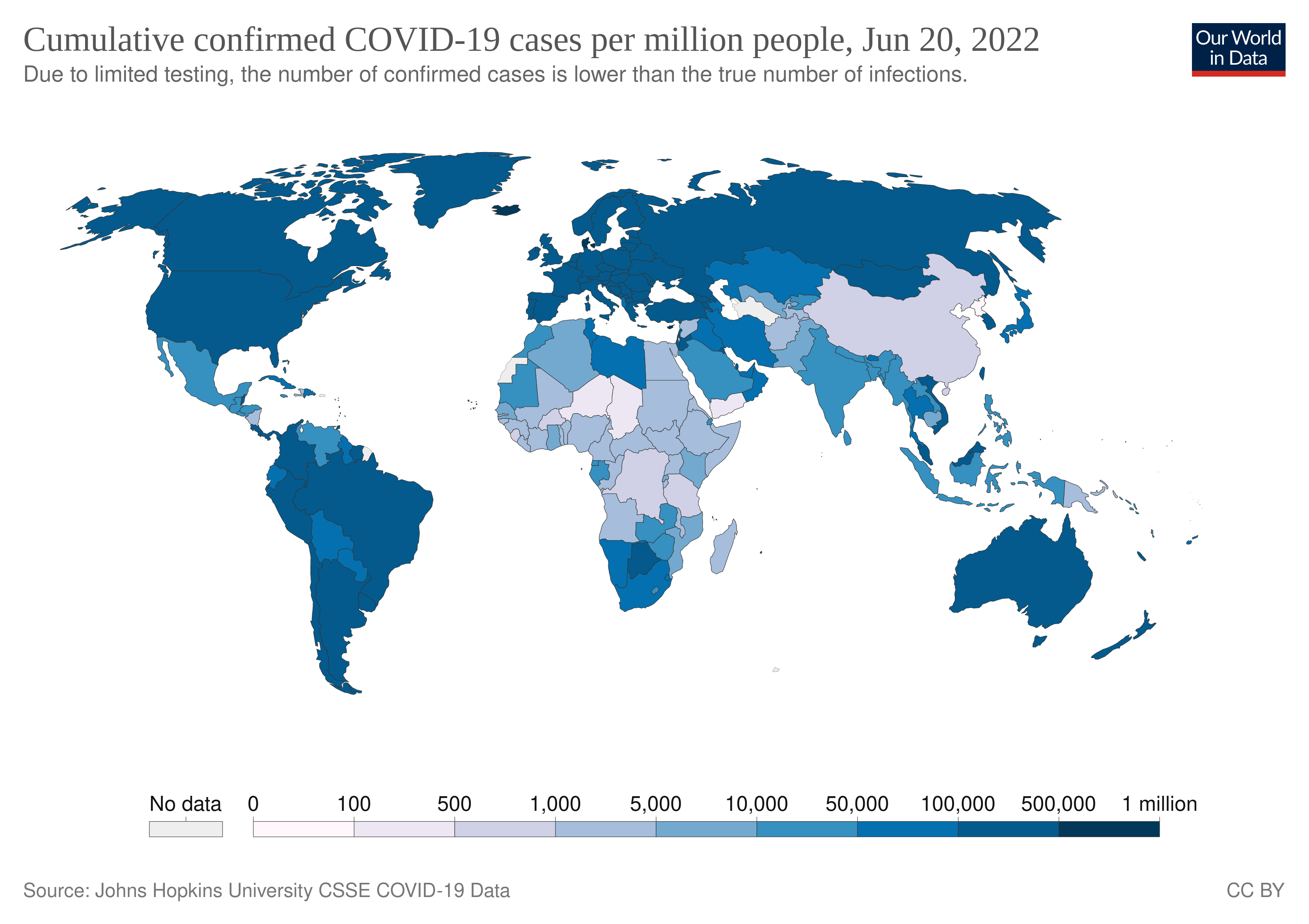
Total confirmed cases of COVID-19 per million people

SARS-CoV-2, a new strain of coronavirus, was first detected in the city of Wuhan, Hubei Province, China, in December 2019. The outbreak was characterized as a Public Health Emergency of International Concern (PHEIC) between January 2020 and May 2023 by WHO. As of May 2026 the number of people infected with COVID-19 is almost 780 million worldwide, with a death toll of 7.1 million. It is considered likely that the virus will eventually become endemic and, like the common cold, cause less severe disease for most people.

==== HIV/AIDS ====
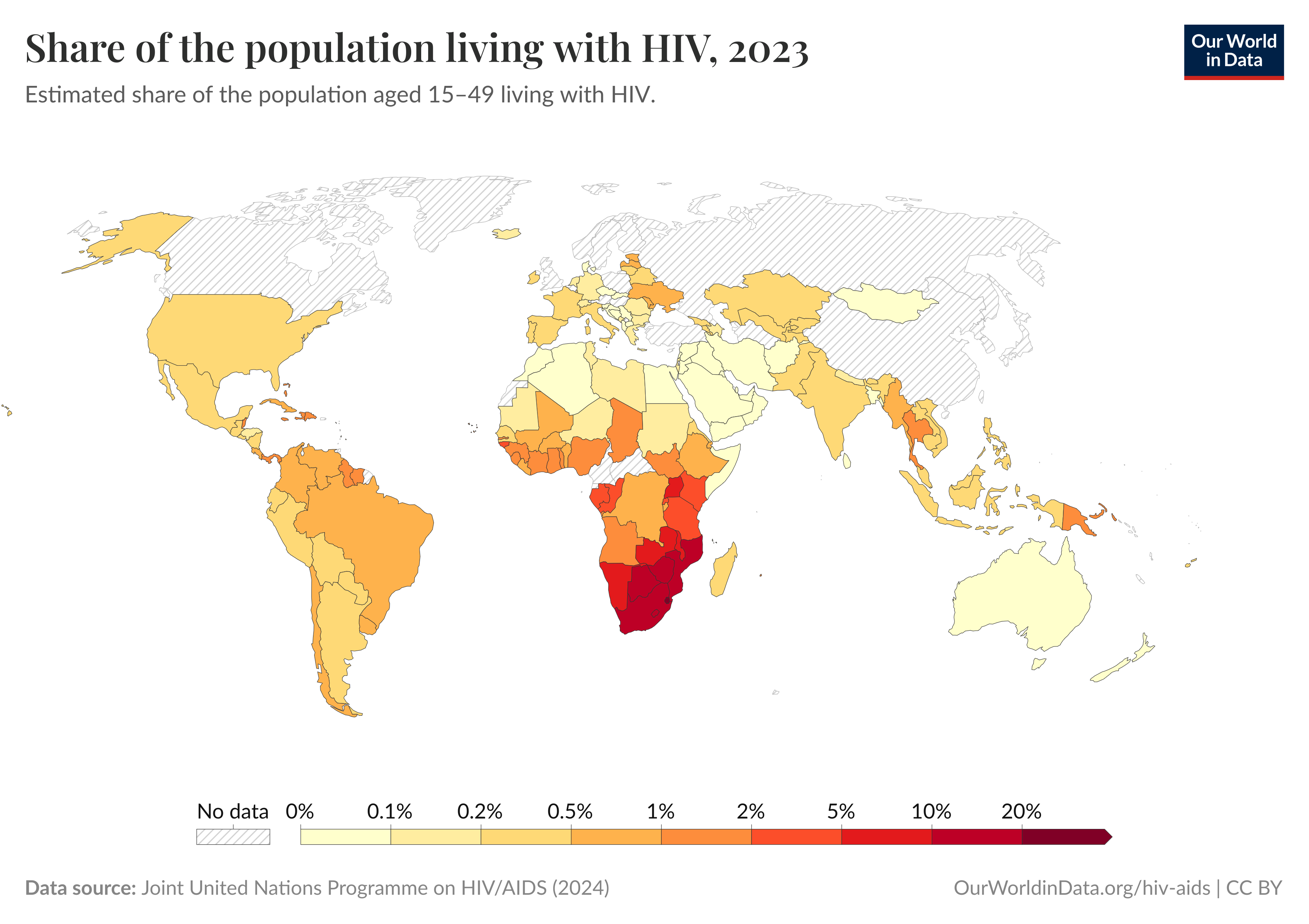
A world map illustrating the proportion of population infected with HIV in 2023

HIV/AIDS was first identified as a disease in 1981, and is an ongoing worldwide public health issue. Since then, HIV/AIDS has killed an estimated 40 million people with a further 630,000 deaths annually; 39 million people are currently living with HIV infection. (Note: Statistics as at the end of 2022) HIV has a zoonotic origin, having originated in nonhuman primates in Central Africa and transferred to humans in the early 20th century. The most frequent mode of transmission of HIV is through sexual contact with an infected person. There may be a short period of mild, nonspecific symptoms followed by an asymptomatic (but nevertheless infectious) stage called clinical latency – without treatment, this stage can last between 3 and 20 years. The only way to detect infection is by means of a HIV test. There is no vaccine to prevent HIV infection, but the disease can be held in check by means of antiretroviral therapy.

=== Pandemics in history ===
Historical accounts of epidemics are often vague or contradictory in describing how victims were affected. A rash accompanied by a fever might be smallpox, measles, scarlet fever, or varicella, and it is possible that epidemics overlapped, with multiple infections striking the same population at once. It is often impossible to know the exact causes of mortality, although ancient DNA studies can sometimes detect residues of certain pathogens.

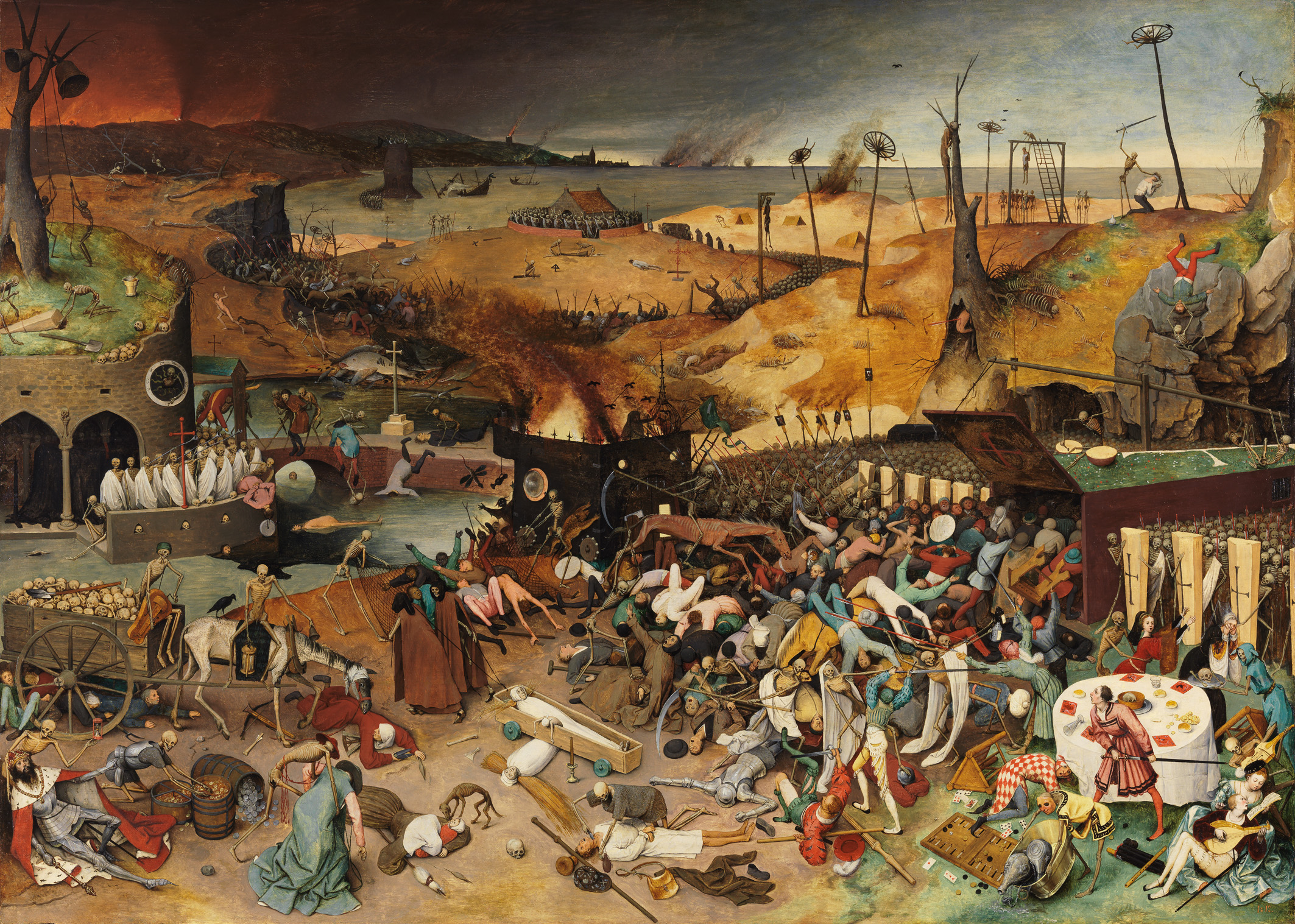
Pieter Bruegel's The Triumph of Death (c. 1562) reflects the social upheaval and terror that followed the plague, which devastated medieval Europe.

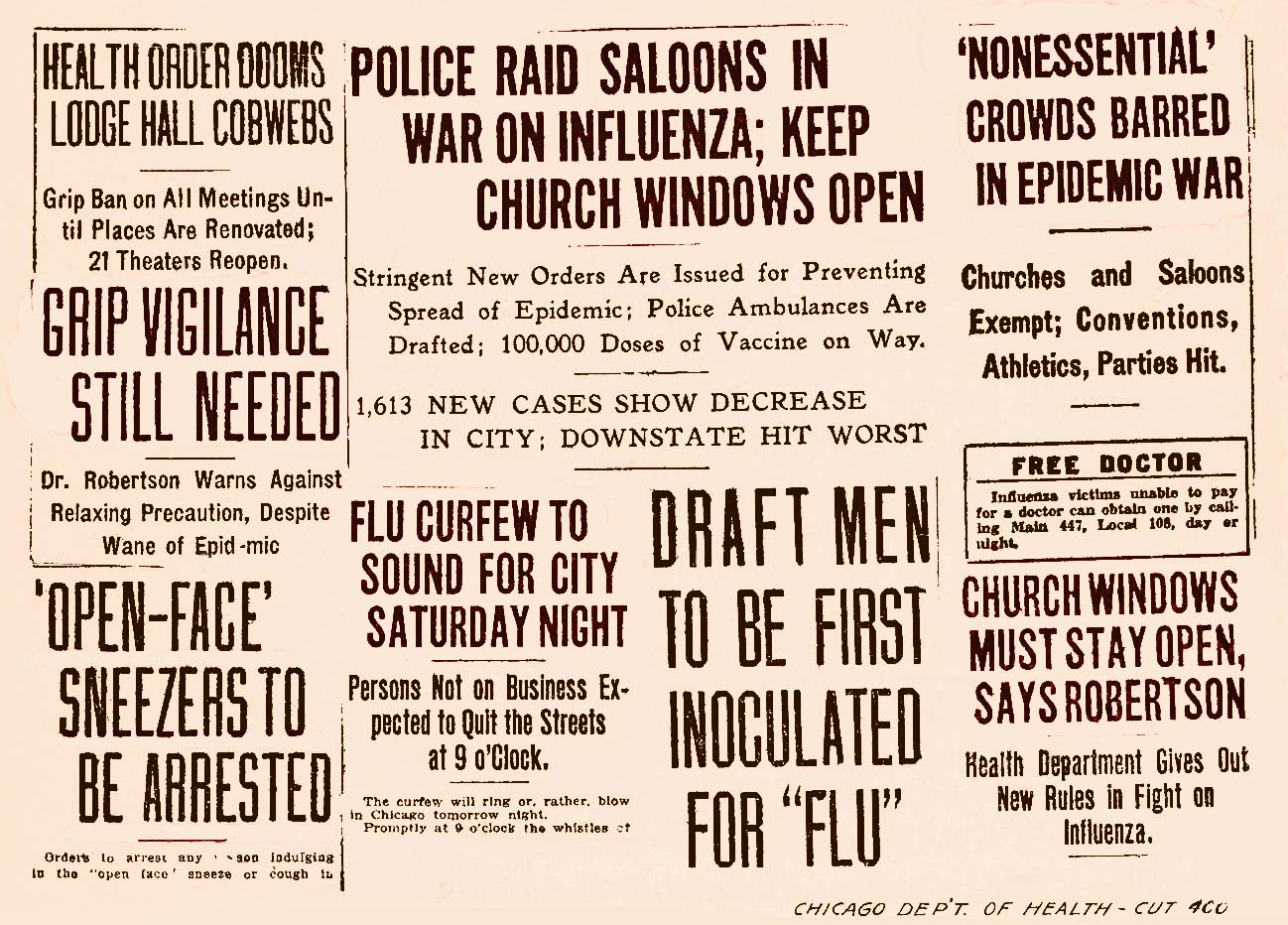
1918 Chicago newspaper headlines reflect mitigation strategies for the Spanish flu, such as increased ventilation, arrests for "open-face sneezes and coughs", sequenced inoculations, limitations on crowd size, selective closing of businesses, curfews, and lockdowns.

It is assumed that, prior to the Neolithic Revolution around 10,000 BC, disease outbreaks were limited to a single family or clan, and did not spread widely before dying out. The domestication of animals increased human-animal contact, increasing the possibility of zoonotic infections. The advent of agriculture, and trade between settled groups, made it possible for pathogens to spread widely. As the population increased, contact between groups became more frequent. A history of epidemics maintained by the Chinese Empire from 243 B.C. to 1911 A.C. shows an approximate correlation between the frequency of epidemics and the growth of the population.

Here is an incomplete list of known epidemics which have spread widely enough to merit the title "pandemic".

- Plague of Athens (430 to 426 BC): During the Peloponnesian War, an epidemic killed a quarter of the Athenian troops and a quarter of the population. This disease fatally weakened the dominance of Athens, but the sheer virulence of the disease prevented its wider spread; i.e., it killed off its hosts at a rate faster than they could spread it. The exact cause of the plague was unknown for many years. In January 2006, researchers from the University of Athens analyzed teeth recovered from a mass grave underneath the city and confirmed the presence of bacteria responsible for typhoid fever.
- Antonine Plague (165 to 180 AD): Possibly measles or smallpox brought to the Italian peninsula by soldiers returning from the Near East, it killed a quarter of those infected, up to five million in total.
- Plague of Cyprian (251–266 AD): A second outbreak of what may have been the same disease as the Antonine Plague killed (it was said) 5,000 people a day in Rome.
- Plague of Justinian (541 to 549 AD): Also known as the First Plague Pandemic. This epidemic started in Egypt and reached Constantinople the following spring, killing (according to the Byzantine chronicler Procopius) 10,000 a day at its height, and perhaps 40% of the city's inhabitants. The plague went on to eliminate a quarter to half the human population of the known world and was identified in 2013 as being caused by bubonic plague.
- Black Death (1331 to 1353): Also known as the Second Plague Pandemic. The total number of deaths worldwide is estimated at 75 to 200 million. Starting in Asia, the disease reached the Mediterranean and western Europe in 1348 (possibly from Italian merchants fleeing fighting in Crimea) and killed an estimated 20 to 30 million Europeans in six years; a third of the total population, and up to a half in the worst-affected urban areas. It was the first of a cycle of European plague epidemics that continued until the 18th century; there were more than 100 plague epidemics in Europe during this period, including the Great Plague of London of 1665–66 which killed approximately 100,000 people, 20% of London's population.
- 1817–1824 cholera pandemic. Previously endemic in the Indian subcontinent, the pandemic began in Bengal, then spread across India by 1820. The deaths of 10,000 British troops were documented - it is assumed that tens of thousands of Indians must have died. The disease spread as far as China, Indonesia (where more than 100,000 people succumbed on the island of Java alone) and the Caspian Sea before receding. Subsequent cholera pandemics during the 19th century are estimated to have caused many millions of deaths globally.
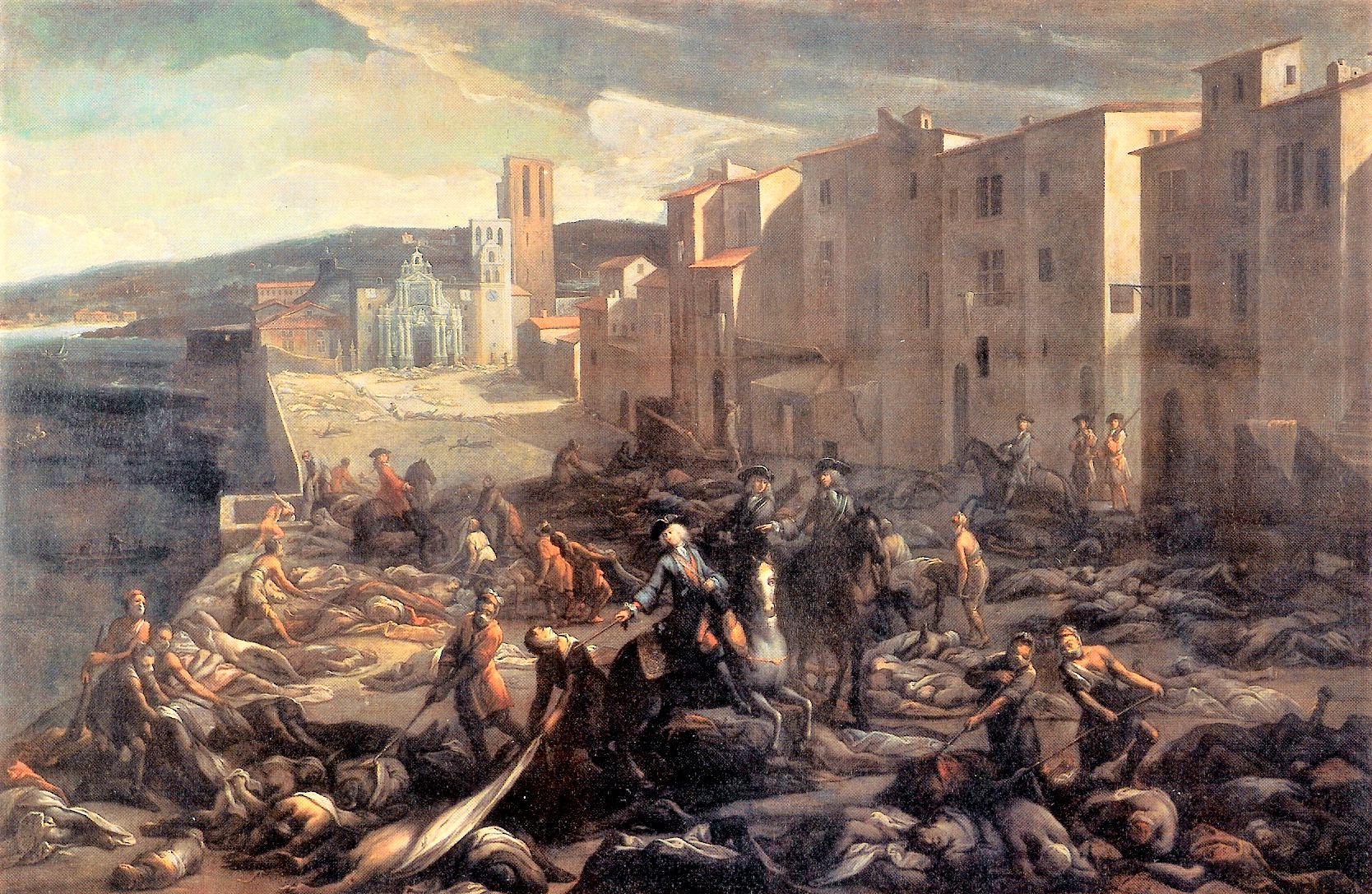
  Great Plague of Marseille in 1720 killed a total of 100,000 people
- Third plague pandemic (1855–1960): Starting in China, it is estimated to have caused over 12 million deaths in total, the majority of them in India. During this pandemic, the United States saw its first outbreak: the San Francisco plague of 1900–1904. The causative bacterium, Yersinia pestis, was identified in 1894. The association with fleas, and in particular rat fleas in urban environments, led to effective control measures. The pandemic was considered to be over in 1959 when annual deaths due to plague dropped below 200. The disease is nevertheless present in the rat population worldwide and isolated human cases still occur.
- The 1918–1920 Spanish flu infected half a billion people around the world, including on remote Pacific islands and in the Arctic—killing 20 to 100 million. Most influenza outbreaks disproportionately kill the very young and the very old, but the 1918 pandemic had an unusually high mortality rate for young adults. It killed more people in 25 weeks than AIDS did in its first 25 years. Mass troop movements and close quarters during World War I caused it to spread and mutate faster, and the susceptibility of soldiers to the flu may have been increased by stress, malnourishment and chemical attacks. Improved transportation systems made it easier for soldiers, sailors and civilian travelers to spread the disease.

=== Pandemics in indigenous populations ===
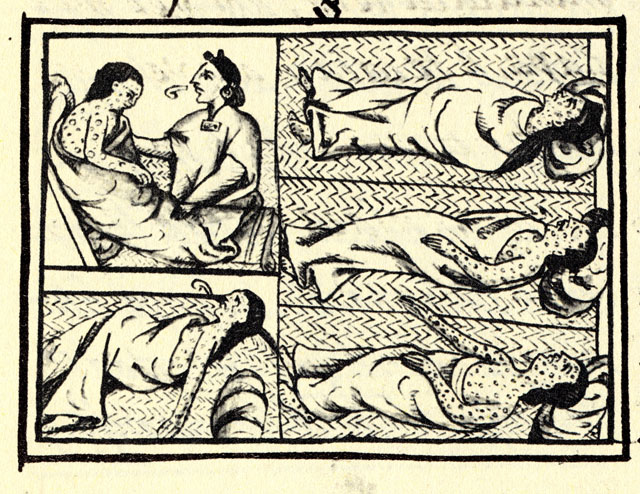
Aztecs dying of smallpox, Florentine Codex (compiled 1540–1585)

Beginning from the Middle Ages, encounters between European settlers and native populations in the rest of the world often introduced epidemics of extraordinary virulence. Settlers introduced novel diseases which were endemic in Europe, such as smallpox, measles, pertussis and influenza, to which the indigenous peoples had no immunity. The Europeans infected with such diseases typically carried them in a dormant state, were actively infected but asymptomatic, or had only mild symptoms.

Smallpox was the most destructive disease that was brought by Europeans to the Native Americans, both in terms of morbidity and mortality. The first well-documented smallpox epidemic in the Americas began in Hispaniola in late 1518 and soon spread to Mexico. Estimates of mortality range from one-quarter to one-half of the population of central Mexico. It is estimated that over the 100 years after European arrival in 1492, the indigenous population of the Americas dropped from 60 million to only 6 million, due to a combination of disease, war, and famine. The majority these deaths are attributed to successive waves of introduced diseases such as smallpox, measles, and typhoid fever.

In Australia, smallpox was introduced by European settlers in 1789 devastating the Australian Aboriginal population, killing an estimated 50% of those infected with the disease during the first decades of colonisation. In the early 1800s, measles, smallpox and intertribal warfare killed an estimated 20,000 New Zealand Māori.

In 1848–49, as many as 40,000 out of 150,000 Hawaiians are estimated to have died of measles, whooping cough and influenza. Measles killed more than 40,000 Fijians, approximately one-third of the population, in 1875, and in the early 19th century devastated the Great Andamanese population. In Hokkaido, an epidemic of smallpox introduced by Japanese settlers is estimated to have killed 34% of the native Ainu population in 1845.

== Concerns about future pandemics ==
Prevention of future pandemics requires steps to identify future causes of pandemics and to take preventive measures before the disease moves uncontrollably into the human population.

For example, influenza is a rapidly evolving disease which has caused pandemics in the past and has the potential to cause future pandemics. WHO collates the findings of 144 national influenza centres worldwide which monitor emerging flu viruses. Virus variants which are assessed as likely to represent a significant risk are identified and can then be incorporated into the next seasonal influenza vaccine program.

In a press conference on 28 December 2020, Mike Ryan, head of the WHO Emergencies Program, and other officials said the current COVID-19 pandemic was "not necessarily the big one" and "the next pandemic may be more severe." They called for preparation. WHO and the UN have warned the world must tackle the cause of pandemics and not just the health and economic symptoms.

=== Diseases with pandemic potential ===
There is always a possibility that a disease which has caused epidemics in the past may return in the future. It is also possible that little known diseases may become more virulent; in order to encourage research, a number of organisations which monitor global health have drawn up lists of diseases which may have pandemic potential; see table below. (Note: As of June 2023, the WHO is reviewing its list)

List of potential pandemic diseases according to global health organisations
	WHO	CEPI	GAVI
Chikungunya		Yes	
COVID-19	Yes		
Crimean-Congo haemorrhagic fever	Yes		Yes
Ebola	Yes	Yes	Yes
Lassa fever	Yes	Yes	Yes
Marburg virus disease	Yes		Yes
Mpox			Yes
Middle East respiratory syndrome coronavirus (MERS-CoV)	Yes		Yes
Nipah and other henipaviral diseases	Yes	Yes	Yes
Rift Valley fever	Yes	Yes	Yes
Severe Acute Respiratory Syndrome (SARS)	Yes	Yes	Yes
Zika	Yes		Yes
Disease X (Note: Disease X represents the knowledge that a serious international epidemic could be caused by a pathogen currently unknown to cause human disease.)	Yes	Yes	

==== Coronaviruses ====
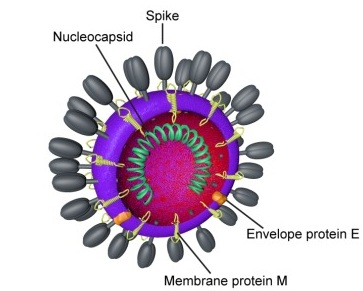
A generic coronavirus illustration

Coronavirus diseases are a family of usually mild illnesses in humans, including those such as the common cold, that have resulted in outbreaks and pandemics such as the 1889–1890 pandemic, the 2002–2004 SARS outbreak, Middle East respiratory syndrome–related coronavirus and the COVID-19 pandemic. There is widespread concern that members of the coronavirus family, particularly SARS and MERS have the potential to cause future pandemics. Many human coronaviruses have zoonotic origins with natural reservoir in bats or rodents, leading to concerns for future spillover events.

Following the end of the COVID-19 pandemic Public Health Emergency of International Concern deceleration by WHO, WHO Director General Tedros Ghebreyesus stated he would not hesitate to re-declare COVID-19 a PHEIC should the global situation worsen in the coming months or years.

==== Influenza ====
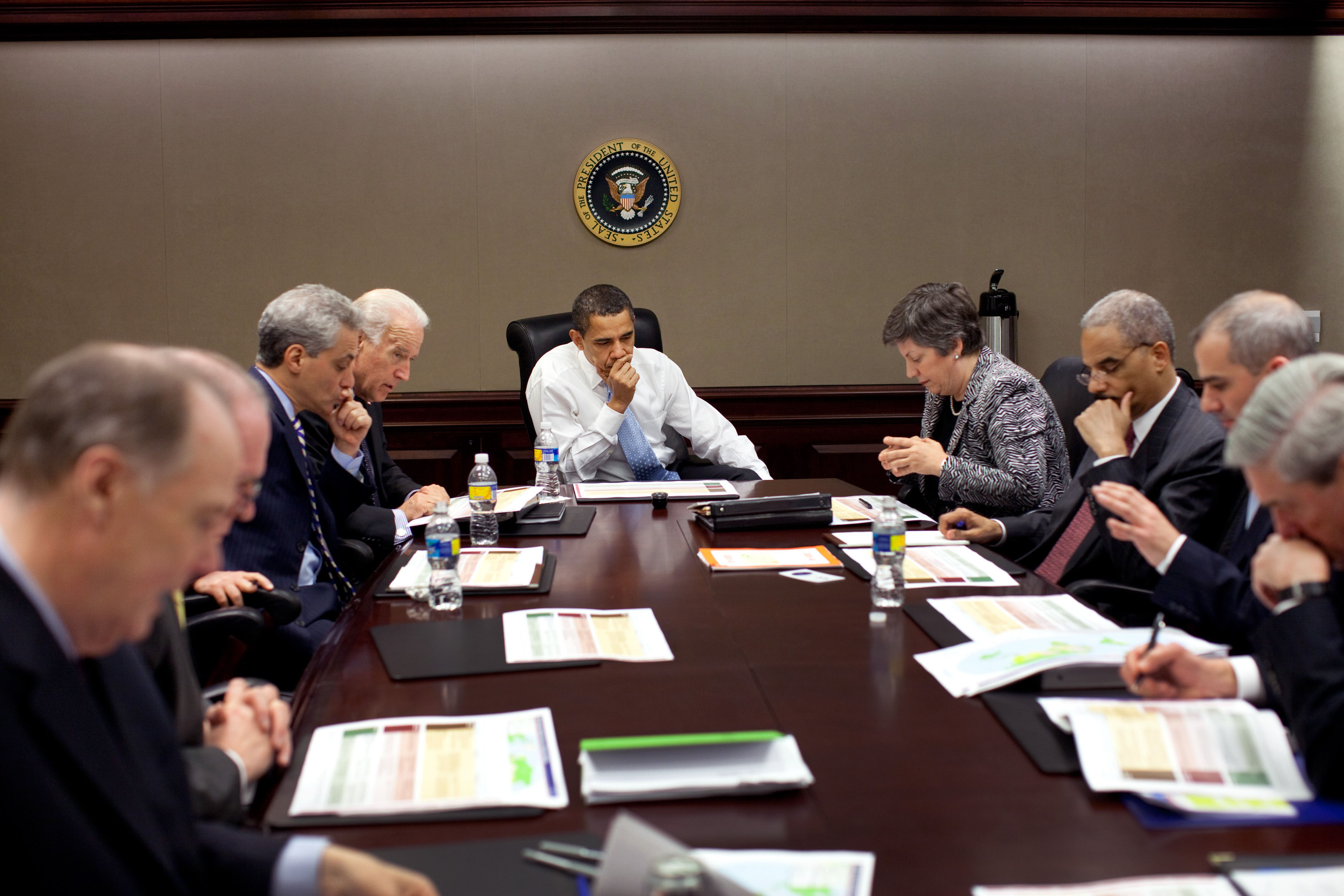
President Barack Obama is briefed in the Situation Room about the 2009 flu pandemic, which killed as many as 17,000 Americans.

Influenza was first described by the Greek physician Hippocrates in 412 BC. Since the Middle Ages, influenza pandemics have been recorded every 10 to 30 years as the virus mutates to evade immunity.

Influenza is an endemic disease, with a fairly constant number of cases which vary seasonally and can, to a certain extent, be predicted. In a typical year, 5–15% of the population contracts influenza. There are 3–5 million severe cases annually, with up to 650,000 respiratory-related deaths globally each year. The 1889–1890 pandemic is estimated to have caused around a million fatalities, and the "Spanish flu" of 1918–1920 eventually infected about one-third of the world's population and caused an estimated 50 million fatalities.

The Global Influenza Surveillance and Response System (GISRS) is a global network of laboratories whose purpose is to monitor the spread of influenza with the aim to provide WHO with influenza control information. More than two million respiratory specimens are tested by GISRS annually to monitor the spread and evolution of influenza viruses through a network of about 150 laboratories in 114 countries representing 91% of the world's population.

=== Antibiotic resistance ===
Antibiotic-resistant microorganisms, which sometimes are referred to as "superbugs", may contribute to the re-emergence of diseases with pandemic potential that are currently well controlled.

For example, cases of tuberculosis that are resistant to traditionally effective treatments remain a cause of great concern to health professionals. Every year, nearly half a million new cases of multidrug-resistant tuberculosis (MDR-TB) are estimated to occur worldwide. China and India have the highest rate of MDR-TB. WHO reports that approximately 50 million people worldwide are infected with MDR-TB, with 79 percent of those cases resistant to three or more antibiotics. Extensively drug-resistant tuberculosis (XDR-TB) was first identified in Africa in 2006 and subsequently discovered to exist in 49 countries. During 2021 there were estimated to be around 25,000 cases XDR-TB worldwide.

In the past 20 years, other common bacteria including Staphylococcus aureus, Serratia marcescens and Enterococcus, have developed resistance to a wide range of antibiotics. Antibiotic-resistant organisms have become an important cause of healthcare-associated (nosocomial) infections.

=== Climate change ===
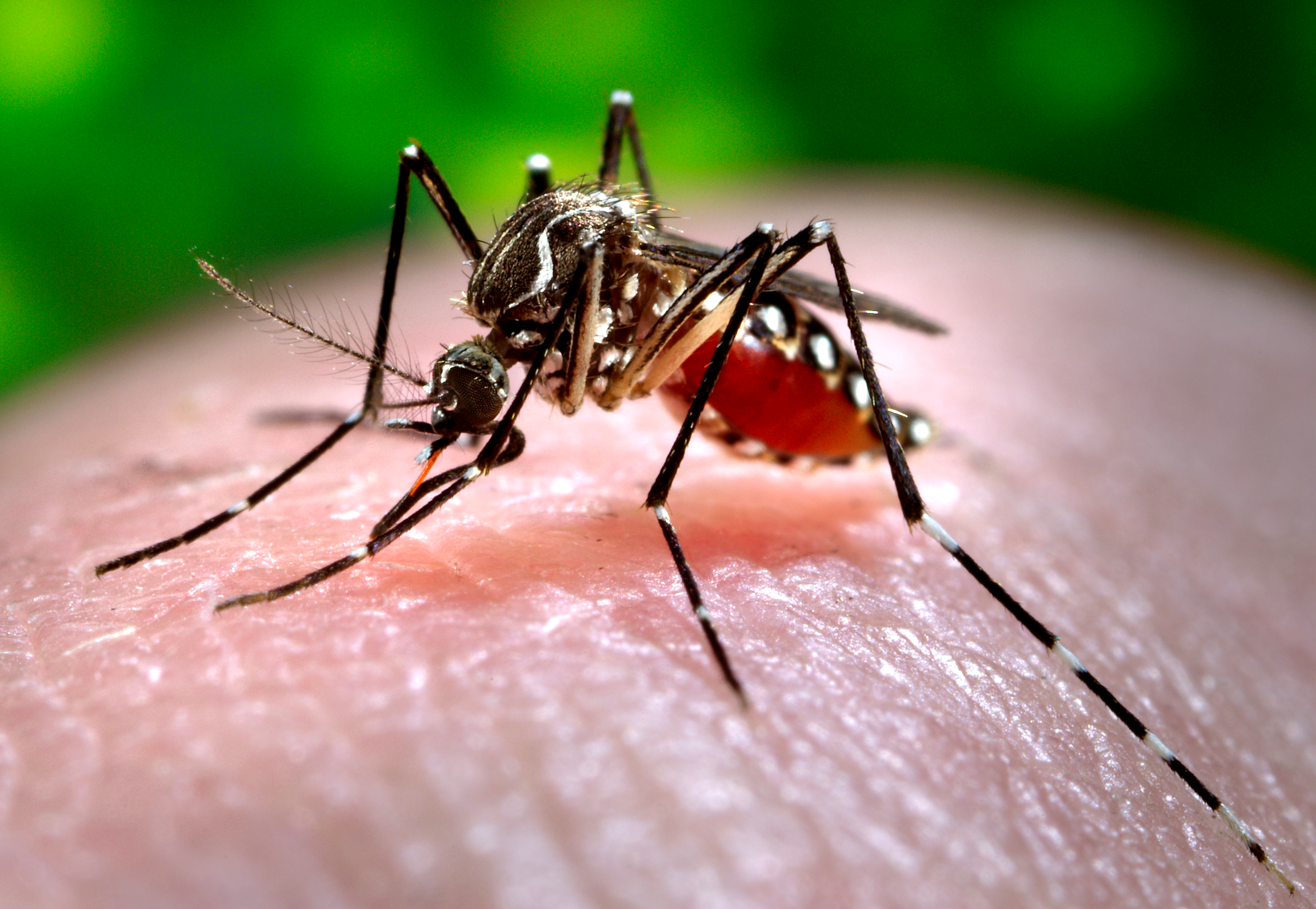
Aedes aegypti, the mosquito that is the vector for dengue transmission.

There are two groups of infectious diseases that may be affected by climate change. The first group are vector-borne diseases which are transmitted via insects such as mosquitos or ticks. Some of these diseases, such as malaria, yellow fever, and dengue fever, can have potentially severe health consequences. Climate can affect the distribution of these diseases due to the changing geographic range of their vectors, with the potential to cause serious outbreaks in areas where the disease has not previously been known. The other group comprises water-borne diseases such as cholera, dysentery, and typhoid which may increase in prevalence due to changes in rainfall patterns.

=== Encroaching into wildlands ===
The October 2020 'era of pandemics' report by the United Nations' Intergovernmental Science-Policy Platform on Biodiversity and Ecosystem Services, written by 22 experts in a variety of fields, said the anthropogenic destruction of biodiversity is paving the way to the pandemic era and could result in as many as 850,000 viruses being transmitted from animals—in particular birds and mammals—to humans. The "exponential rise" in consumption and trade of commodities such as meat, palm oil, and metals, largely facilitated by developed nations, and a growing human population, are the primary drivers of this destruction. According to Peter Daszak, the chair of the group who produced the report, "there is no great mystery about the cause of the Covid-19 pandemic or any modern pandemic. The same human activities that drive climate change and biodiversity loss also drive pandemic risk through their impacts on our environment." Proposed policy options from the report include taxing meat production and consumption, cracking down on the illegal wildlife trade, removing high-risk species from the legal wildlife trade, eliminating subsidies to businesses that are harmful to the natural world, and establishing a global surveillance network.

In June 2021, a team of scientists assembled by the Harvard Medical School Center for Health and the Global Environment warned that the primary cause of pandemics so far, the anthropogenic destruction of the natural world through such activities including deforestation and hunting, is being ignored by world leaders.

=== Melting permafrost ===
Permafrost covers a fifth of the northern hemisphere and is made up of soil that has been kept at temperatures below freezing for long periods. Viable samples of viruses have been recovered from thawing permafrost, after having been frozen for many years, sometimes for millennia. There is a remote possibility that a thawed pathogen could infect humans or animals.

=== Artificial intelligence ===
Experts have raised concerns that advances in artificial intelligence could facilitate the design of particularly dangerous pathogens with pandemic potential. They recommended in 2024 that governments implement mandatory oversight and testing requirements.

== Economic consequences ==
In 2016, the commission on a Global Health Risk Framework for the Future estimated that pandemic disease events would cost the global economy over $6 trillion in the 21st century—over $60 billion per year. The same report recommended spending $4.5 billion annually on global prevention and response capabilities to reduce the threat posed by pandemic events, a figure that the World Bank Group raised to $13 billion in a 2019 report. It has been suggested that such costs be paid from a tax on aviation rather than from, e.g., income taxes, given the crucial role of air traffic in transforming local epidemics into pandemics (being the only factor considered in state-of-the-art models of long-range disease transmission).

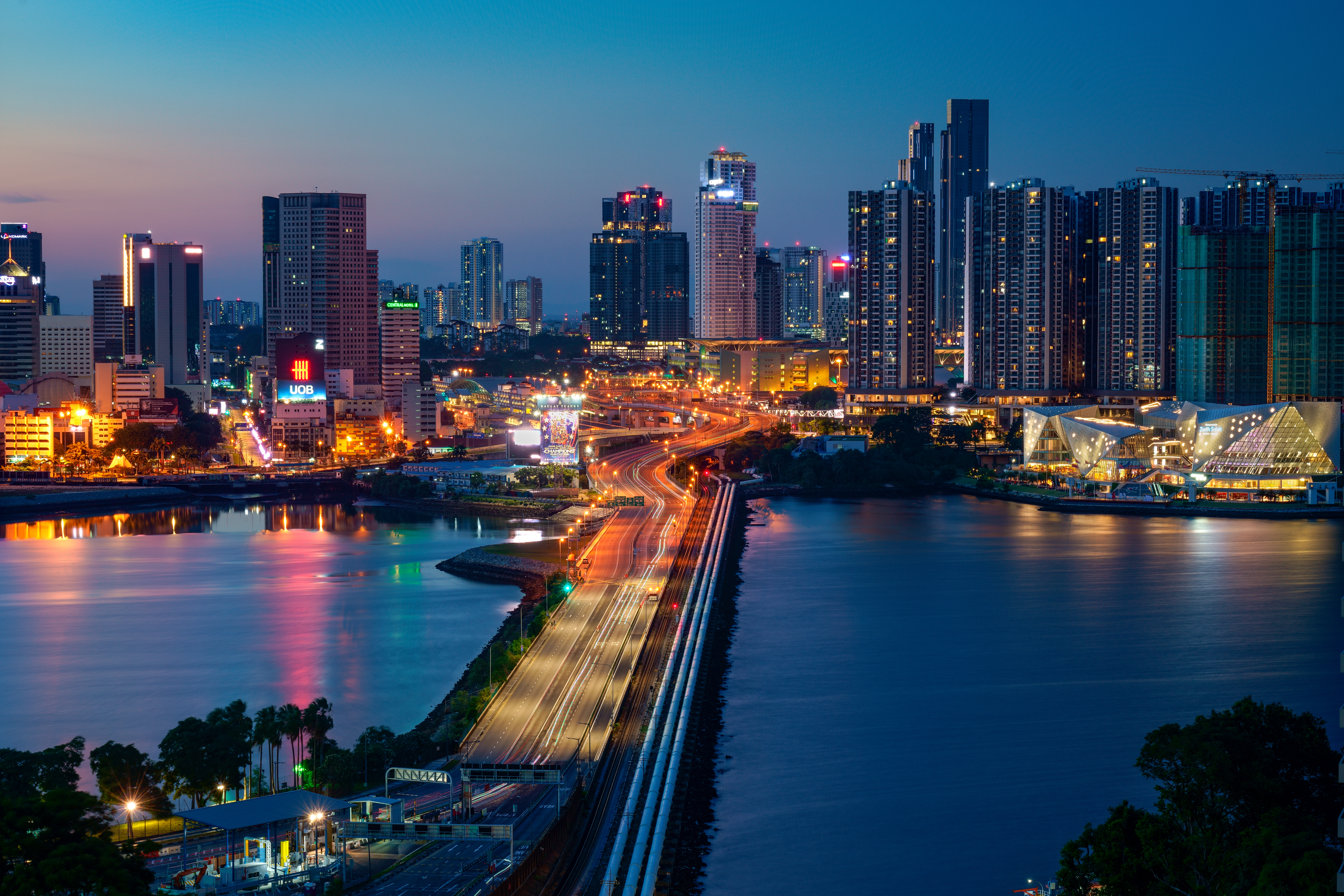
An empty Johor–Singapore Causeway (facing Johor Bahru) during the Covid-19 pandemic. Pre-pandemic this road supported 350,000 international daily passenger journeys.

The COVID-19 pandemic is expected to have a profound negative effect on the global economy, potentially for years to come, with substantial drops in GDP accompanied by increases in unemployment noted around the world. The slowdown of economic activity early in the COVID-19 pandemic had a profound effect on emissions of pollutants and greenhouse gases. Analysis of ice cores taken from the Swiss Alps has revealed a reduction in atmospheric lead pollution over a four-year period corresponding to the years 1349 to 1353 (when the Black Death was ravaging Europe), indicating a reduction in mining and economic activity generally.

== See also ==
- Asian Flu of 1957
- Biological hazard
- Compartmental models in epidemiology
- Contagious disease
- Crowdmapping
- Disease X
- European Centre for Disease Prevention and Control (ECDC)
- Hong Kong Flu of 1968
- Immunization
- Index case
- Mortality from infectious diseases
- List of pandemics and epidemics
- Mathematical modelling of infectious disease
- Medieval demography
- Pandemic fatigue
- Pandemic severity index
- Public health emergency of international concern
- Super-spreader
- Syndemic
- Tropical disease
- Timeline of global health
- Twindemic
- Vaccination
- WHO pandemic phases
