= Pandemic Severity Assessment Framework =

Evaluation framework for influenza

The Pandemic Severity Assessment Framework (PSAF) is an evaluation framework published by the Centers for Disease Control and Prevention in 2016 which uses quadrants to evaluate both the transmissibility and clinical severity of an influenza pandemic and to combine these into an overall impact estimate. Clinical severity is calculated via multiple measures including case fatality rate, case-hospitalization ratios, and deaths-hospitalizations ratios, while viral transmissibility is measured via available data among secondary household attack rates, school attack rates, workplace attack rates, community attack rates, rates of emergency department and outpatient visits for influenza-like illness.

The PSAF superseded the 2007 linear Pandemic Severity Index (PSI), which assumed 30% spread and measured case fatality rate (CFR) to assess the severity and evolution of the pandemic. The United States Centers for Disease Control and Prevention (CDC) adopted the PSAF as its official pandemic severity assessment tool in 2014, and it was the official pandemic severity assessment tool listed in the CDC's National Pandemic Strategy at the time of the COVID-19 pandemic.

== Measures used in the framework ==
Historically, measures of influenza pandemic severity were based on the case fatality rate. However, the case fatality rate might not be an adequate measure of pandemic severity during a pandemic response because:

- Deaths may lag several weeks behind cases, making the case fatality rate an underestimate
- The total number of cases may not be known, making the case fatality rate an overestimate
- A single case fatality rate for the entire population may obscure the effect on vulnerable sub-populations, such as children, the elderly, those with chronic conditions, and members of certain racial and ethnic minorities
- Fatalities alone may not account for the full effects of the pandemic, such as absenteeism or demand on healthcare services

To account for the limitations of measuring the case fatality rate alone, the PSAF rates severity of a disease outbreak on two dimensions: clinical severity of illness in infected persons; and the transmissibility of the infection in the population. Each dimension can be measured using more than one measure, which are scaled to facilitate comparison. Having multiple measures for each dimension offers flexibility to choose a measure that is readily available, accurate, and representative of the impact of the pandemic. It also allows comparison across measures for a more complete understanding of the severity. The framework gives commentary on the strengths and limitations of various measures of clinical severity and transmissibility as well as guidelines for scaling them. It also provides examples of assessing past pandemics using the framework.

=== Measures of transmissibility ===
The original documentation for the PSAF includes the following as potential measures of transmissibility:

- Basic reproduction number R_{0} and serial interval
- Estimated attack rate (community, household, school, workplace)
- Medically attended outpatient influenza-like illness visits
- Underlying population immunity
- Genetic markers of transmissibility
- Animal transmission experiments
- School/workplace absenteeism, including healthcare workers

=== Measures of clinical severity ===
The original documentation for the PSAF includes the following as potential measures of clinical severity:

- Case fatality rate and case hospitalization rate
- Ratio of deaths to hospitalizations
- Genetic markers of virulence
- Animal immunopathologic experiments
- Percent of emergency department visits that resulted in hospitalization
- Percent of hospitalizations admitted to intensive care unit
- Rate of hospitalization
- Excess deaths

== Severity of past pandemics ==
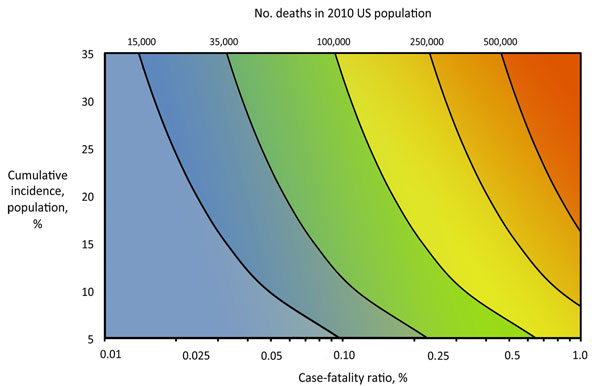
Estimates of hypothetical influenza deaths in the 2010 United States population (308,745,538 persons) across varying values of case-fatality ratio and the cumulative incidence of infection in the population. Selected estimated numbers of deaths are indicated with a black line, across each relevant combination of case-fatality ratio and cumulative incidence. In addition, the background color transitions from blue to yellow to red as the estimated absolute number of deaths increases. Case-fatality ratio is an example of a clinical severity measure and cumulative incidence of infection is an example of a transmissibility measure in the Pandemic Severity Assessment Framework.

The original developers of the PSAF provided a model for the number of hypothetical deaths in the United States 2010 population of an influenza pandemic using the PSAF. While the axes of the PSAF are scaled measures of transmissibility and clinical severity, this model uses the case-fatality ratio instead of the scaled measure of clinical severity and the cumulative incidence of infection instead of the scaled measure of transmissibility.

=== Influenza severity ===
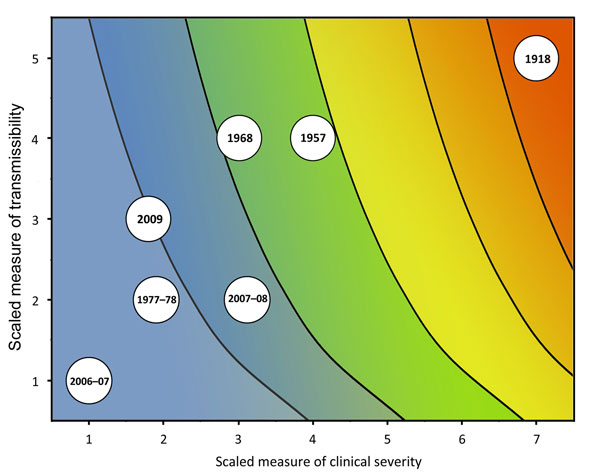
Scaled examples of past influenza pandemics and past influenza seasons. Color scheme included to represent corresponding estimates of hypothetical influenza deaths in the 2010 US population, with the same color scale as the previous figure.

During its development, the PSAF was applied to past influenza pandemics and epidemics, resulting in the following assessments:

Influenza pandemic or flu season	Transmissibility	Clinical Severity
Spanish flu pandemic	5	7
1957–1958 influenza pandemic	4	4
1968 influenza pandemic	4	3
1977-1978 influenza epidemic	2	2
2006-2007 flu season	1	1
2007-2008 flu season	2	3
2009 swine flu pandemic	3	2

=== COVID-19 pandemic severity ===
A team of Brazilian researchers preliminarily assessed the severity of the COVID-19 pandemic using the PSAF in April 2020 based on Chinese data as at 11 February 2020. In their preliminary assessment, they rate COVID-19's scaled transmissibility at 5 and its scaled clinical severity at 4 to 7, placing the COVID-19 pandemic in the "very high severity" quadrant. This preliminary assessment ranks the COVID-19 pandemic as the most severe pandemic since the 1918 influenza pandemic.

Human and pandemic coronaviruses	Transmissibility	Clinical Severity
COVID-19 pandemic	5	4~7

== See also ==
- COVID-19 pandemic in the United States
- Early Warning and Response System
- Influenza pandemic
- Pandemic Severity Index
- WHO pandemic phases
