= International Partnership on Avian and Pandemic Influenza =

President George W. Bush announced the International Partnership on Avian and Pandemic Influenza in his remarks to the High-Level Plenary Meeting of the United Nations General Assembly on September 14, 2005, in New York. On September 15, 2005, Under Secretary of State for Democracy and Global Affairs Dr. Paula Dobriansky was joined by the Director General of the World Health Organization Dr. Lee Jong-wook, Executive Director of UNICEF Ann Veneman, and senior representatives from several participating countries to describe the Partnerships goals of improving global readiness by:

- elevating the issue on national agendas;
- coordinating efforts among donor and affected nations;
- mobilizing and leveraging resources;
- increasing transparency in disease reporting and surveillance; and
- building capacity to identify, contain and respond to a pandemic influenza.

== Statement of core principles ==
The International Partnership on Avian and Pandemic Influenza is committed to protecting human and animal health as well as mitigating the global socioeconomic and security consequences of an influenza pandemic. The partnership seeks to work with all concerned states to limit the spread of H5N1 avian flu and any other highly pathogenic influenza strain by taking all necessary steps to prevent, prepare for, and respond to the growing threat.

Partners are concerned about the potential for large-scale outbreaks. As such, participants are committed to the following principles to establish a more coordinated and effective basis for limiting the social, economic and health impacts of avian and pandemic influenza, consistent with national legal authorities and relevant international law and frameworks.

Noting that enhanced global cooperation on avian and pandemic influenza will provide a template for global cooperation to address other types of health emergencies, we join together in our commitment to:

1. International cooperation to protect the lives and health of our people;
2. Timely and sustained high-level global political leadership to combat avian and pandemic influenza;
3. Transparency in reporting of influenza cases in humans and in animals caused by strains that have pandemic potential, to increase understanding, preparedness and, especially to ensure rapid and timely response to potential outbreaks;
4. Immediate sharing of epidemiological data and samples with the World Health Organization (WHO) and the international community to detect and characterize the nature and evolution of any outbreaks as quickly as possible, by utilizing, where appropriate, existing networks and mechanisms
5. Rapid reaction to address the first signs of accelerated transmission of H5N1 and other highly pathogenic influenza strains so that appropriate international and national resources can be brought to bear;
6. Prevent and contain an incipient epidemic through capacity building and in-country collaboration with international partners;
7. Work in a manner complementary to and supportive of expanded cooperation with and appropriate support of key multilateral organizations (WHO, Food and Agriculture Organization, World Organization for Animal Health);
8. Timely coordination of bilateral and multilateral resource allocations; dedication of domestic resources (human and financial); improvements in public awareness; and development of economic and trade contingency plans;
9. Increased coordination and harmonization of preparedness, prevention, response and containment activities among nations, complementing domestic and regional preparedness initiatives and encouraging where appropriate the development of strategic regional initiatives;
10. Actions based on the best available science.

== Sources and notes ==
- http://www.hhs.gov/pandemicflu/plan/appendixh.html
- https://web.archive.org/web/20080720165521/http://geneva.usmission.gov/Press2005/1108AvianInfluenza.htm
