= Pandemic Preparedness and Response Act =

Bill proposed in the US Senate in 2005

The Pandemic Preparedness and Response Act is a bill introduced on October 5, 2005, by U.S. Senators Harry Reid, Evan Bayh, Dick Durbin, Ted Kennedy, Barack Obama, and Tom Harkin in response to the growing threat of an outbreak of avian influenza. The bill calls for:

- Preparing for a pandemic by finalizing, implementing and funding pandemic preparedness and response plans.
- Improving surveillance and international partnerships to monitor the spread of avian flu and detect the emergence of a flu strain with pandemic potential immediately.
- Protecting Americans through the development, production and distribution of an effective vaccine.
- Planning ahead for a pandemic by stockpiling antivirals, vaccines and other essential medications and supplies.
- Strengthening the public health infrastructure.
- Increasing awareness and education about pandemic flu.
- Devoting adequate resources to pandemic preparedness.

"This bill never became law. This bill was proposed in a previous session of Congress. Sessions of Congress last two years, and at the end of each session all proposed bills and resolutions that haven't passed are cleared from the books. Members often reintroduce bills that did not come up for debate under a new number in the next session. ... Sometimes the text of one bill or resolution is incorporated into another, and in those cases the original bill or resolution, as it would appear here, would seem to be abandoned."

== See also ==
- Coalition for Epidemic Preparedness Innovations
