= Almoguera =

Almoguera, Spain
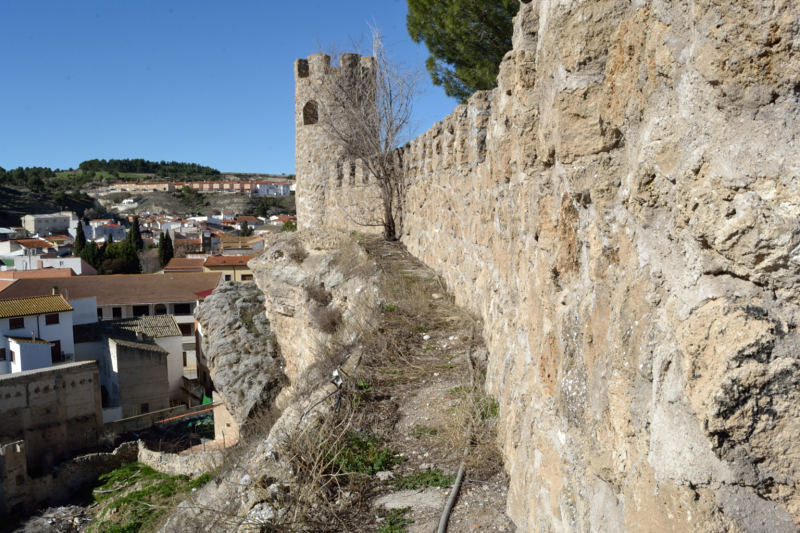

- Flag Coat of arms

- Location within Province of Guadalajara Location within Castilla-La Mancha Location within Spain
- Coordinates: 40°17′56″N 2°58′52″W
- Country: Spain
- Autonomous community: Castile-La Mancha
- Province: Guadalajara
- Municipality: Almoguera

Area
  - Total: 119 km^{2} (46 sq mi)
- Elevation: 659 m (2,162 ft)

Population (2025-01-01)
  - Total: 1,379
  - Density: 11.6/km^{2} (30.0/sq mi)
- Time zone: UTC+1 (CET)
  - Summer (DST): UTC+2 (CEST)

Almoguera is a municipality located in the province of Guadalajara, Castile-La Mancha, Spain. According to the 2004 census (INE), the municipality had a population of 1,418 inhabitants.
