= Early Warning and Response System =

European communicable disease communication system

The Early Warning and Response System (EWRS) for communicable diseases in the European Union was created by the European Commission to "ensure a rapid and effective response by the EU to events (including emergencies) related to communicable diseases."

"EWRS is a web-based system linking the Commission, the public health authorities in Member States responsible for measures to control communicable diseases and the European Centre for Disease Prevention and Control (ECDC). EEA countries (Iceland, Liechtenstein and Norway) are also linked to the system."

== Brexit and COVID-19 ==
In 2020, the Department of Health and Social Care requested that the United Kingdom should keep its access to the EWRS after Brexit in order to combat the global COVID-19 outbreak. This was supported by numerous medical experts and organizations, with Niall Dickson, chief executive of the NHS Confederation, stating that EWRS access was essential to maintain the best possible response. The request was denied by Boris Johnson's government for political reasons, to preserve the government's bargaining position in post-Brexit negotiations.
