= 2000s in medicine =

This is a list of events associated with medicine in the 2000s.

== 2000 ==
- BCG disease outbreak in Finland in the 2000s
- Walkerton E. coli outbreak

=== October ===
- 09: The Nobel Prize in Physiology or Medicine was jointly awarded to Arvid Carlsson, Paul Greengard and Eric Kandel "for their discoveries concerning signal transduction in the nervous system".

== 2001 ==
- 2001 United Kingdom foot-and-mouth outbreak

=== September ===
- 07: The Lindbergh operation is performed, the first successful remote surgery in history.

=== October ===
- 08: The Nobel Prize in Physiology or Medicine was jointly awarded to Leland H. Hartwell, Tim Hunt and Paul M. Nurse "for their discoveries of key regulators of the cell cycle".

== 2002 ==
- 2002–2004 SARS outbreak
- 2002 Barrow-in-Furness legionellosis outbreak

=== October ===
- 07: The Nobel Prize in Physiology or Medicine was jointly awarded to Sydney Brenner, H. Robert Horvitz and John E. Sulston "for their discoveries concerning genetic regulation of organ development and programmed cell death".

== 2003 ==
- 2003 Midwest mpox outbreak
- 2003 Chi-Chi's hepatitis A outbreak

=== October ===
- 06: The Nobel Prize in Physiology or Medicine was jointly awarded to Paul Lauterbur and Peter Mansfield "for their discoveries concerning magnetic resonance imaging".

== 2004 ==
- Global spread of H5N1 in 2004

=== October ===
- 04: The Nobel Prize in Physiology or Medicine was jointly awarded to Richard Axel and Linda B. Buck "for their discoveries of odorant receptors and the organization of the olfactory system".

== 2005 ==
- Global spread of H5N1 in 2005
- 2005 South Wales E. coli O157 outbreak
- 2005 dengue outbreak in Singapore

=== October ===
- 03: The Nobel Prize in Physiology or Medicine was jointly awarded to Barry J. Marshall and J. Robin Warren "for their discovery of the bacterium Helicobacter pylori and its role in gastritis and peptic ulcer disease".

== 2006 ==
- Global spread of H5N1 in 2006
- 2006 dengue outbreak in India
- 2006 dengue outbreak in Pakistan
- 2006 H5N1 outbreak in India
- 2006–2007 East Africa Rift Valley fever outbreak
- 2006 North American E. coli outbreak in spinach
- 2006 North American E. coli O157:H7 outbreaks
- South Korean humidifier disinfectant case

=== October ===
- 02: The Nobel Prize in Physiology or Medicine was jointly awarded to Andrew Z. Fire and Craig C. Mello for their discovery of "RNA interference – gene silencing by double-stranded RNA".

== 2007 ==
- Global spread of H5N1 in 2007
- 2007 Bernard Matthews H5N1 outbreak
- 2007 Iraq cholera outbreak
- 2007 United Kingdom foot-and-mouth outbreak
- 2007 Yap Islands Zika virus outbreak

=== October ===
- 08: The Nobel Prize in Physiology or Medicine was jointly awarded to Mario R. Capecchi, Martin Evans and Oliver Smithies "for their discoveries of principles for introducing specific gene modifications in mice by the use of embryonic stem cells".

== 2008 ==
- 2008 Zimbabwean cholera outbreak
- 2008 Canadian listeriosis outbreak
- 2008–2009 Chile listeriosis outbreak
- 2008 United States salmonellosis outbreak
- 2008 H5N1 outbreak in West Bengal

=== October ===
- 06: The Nobel Prize in Physiology or Medicine was jointly awarded to Harald zur Hausen "for his discovery of human papilloma viruses causing cervical cancer" and to Françoise Barré-Sinoussi and Luc Montagnier "for their discovery of human immunodeficiency virus".

== 2009 ==
- 2009 swine flu pandemic
- 2009–2010 West African meningitis outbreak
- 2009 Gujarat hepatitis outbreak
- 2009 Bolivian dengue fever epidemic

=== October ===
- 05: The Nobel Prize in Physiology or Medicine was jointly awarded to Elizabeth H. Blackburn, Carol W. Greider and Jack W. Szostak "for the discovery of how chromosomes are protected by telomeres and the enzyme telomerase".

== See also ==
- 1990s in medicine
- 2010s in medicine
- Timeline of medicine and medical technology
