= Political positions of Vladimir Zhirinovsky =

Vladimir Zhirinovsky, a member of the State Duma from 1993 to 2022, former leader of the Liberal Democratic Party and perennial Russian presidential candidate (in six elections), took positions on many political issues through his public comments, his presidential campaign statements, and his voting record.

Zhirinovsky's positions tended towards the far-right of Russian politics, commonly being seen as fascist, however, Zhirinovsky himself sharply objected to such a characterization. In addition to being seen as a fascist, Zhirinovsky has also been regarded to be an ultranationalist. His views have also been described as chauvinistic and imperialistic. Zhirinovsky's plans for reshaping the presidency essentially have been to mold it into a dictatorship.

The LDPR defined its members as being individuals who do not separate their personal interests from those of the motherland, a "creator capable of carrying out the priority tasks of the motherland aimed at preserving peace and raising the standard of living of all the population of our vast country."

Zhirinovsky, during the 1993 legislative campaign, referred to LDPR as the “centre-right party” and claimed that its views were such that it could potentially be allied with Women of Russia and Civic Union in the State Duma. Zhirinovsky had a flair for demagoguery. His written policy positions have, at times, been more moderate than those he has espoused in speeches and interviews.

While Zhirinovsky and the LDPR formed a component of the political opposition to Boris Yeltsin in the 1990s, members of the LDPR largely voted against impeaching Yeltsin in 1999. Later, Zhirinovsky and the LDPR often supported the agenda of Vladimir Putin's government when voting in the Duma. Zhirinovsky's support for Putin dates back to Putin's early presidency.

== Domestic policy ==
In the early 1990s, the LDPR declared itself to have "a program for the development of our society in accordance with its own needs without any interference from the outside." This lightly appealed towards the Marxist concept of self-development. The LDPR platform declared that "the political activity of the LDPR is directed toward the restoration by peaceful means and the preservation of the Russian state that was created over the course of centuries; the restoration and guarding of the borders of the country, the realization within the country of the peaceful coexistence of all the populations inhabiting it–both small and large–with the right of preservation of traditions and customs, and the development of each individual's national culture and religion. Russia is a motherland for all, without any kind of discrimination."

In discussing Russia's difficulties, Zhirinovsky scapegoated the peoples of the Caucasus, Jews, neighboring nations, and the West.

Zhirinovsky desired to reestablish the Russian Empire through "imperial reconquest". Zhirinovsky desired for the inner-boundaries to not be ethnically based, and for all inner regions to be subordinate to a strong central government in Moscow, creating an authoritarian Greater Russia. However, in 1996, he temporarily began moving in support of Yeltsin's vision to allow independence of former Soviet republics. However, he spoke in support of seeing regions inhabited by ethnic Russians secede from the Republics and join Russia.

Despite having since taken many positions to the contrary, during his 1991 presidential campaign, Zhirinovsky stated that he saw a need for Russia to rapidly transition to a "European model of society: free economy, human rights in first place, and civil society."

=== Cultural preservation ===
Zhirinovsky opposed using foreign words in the Russian language, suggesting the renaming of the office of president to the "Supreme Ruler". In his 2018 campaign, he proposed banning foreign-language signage, and issuing penalties for every foreign word uttered by the media. The LDPR places an emphasis on the preservation of Russian culture.

In August 2014, Zhirinovsky proposed restoring Russia's Imperial flag and its God Save the Tsar! anthem. He advocated for Volgograd to be renamed Stalingrad (its WWII-era name), not because of his ideological position but out of respect for history. He proposed other Russian cities should restore their Soviet-era names.

=== Ethnic diversity ===
Zhirinovsky, in 1993, stated his belief that the western powers had divided Russia by splintering its ethnic groups, fostering nationalism among the many minority nationalities in Russia.

Zhirinovsky was reported to have declared in the early 1990s, "Dark-skinned street vendors in Moscow make it look like a non-Russian city. This is a black stain that should be eradicated." In a television appearance during his 1992 visit to the United States, Zhirinovsky called "for the preservation of the white race" and warned that the white Americans were in danger of turning their country over to black and Hispanic people. In 2004, Zhirinovsky declared that the west should partner with Russia to expunge the threats of Islamic extremism and Asian immigrants. Zhirinovsky declared, "The white race is perishing. Every day there are fewer and fewer of us. We are half as many as we were 40 years ago. We must unite against the yellow peril and the green menace. We both have the same problem: the invasion of the Asians. You have Pakistan and India, we have central Asia and the Caucasus. Washington, London, Moscow and Tel Aviv need to form a common front. If we don't, the terrorist attacks we see today will continue for another 50 years."

=== Economic policy ===
Zhirinovsky's economic stances in the 1990s were characterized as 'economic populism'.

During his 1991 presidential campaign, Zhirinovsky vowed to remove all limitations from all forms of economic activity and to influence such activity only through taxation. Zhirinosky promised to lower prices on alcohol and to demand its sale in all commercial outlets. He summarized this campaign pledge by promising cheap vodka "at every corner, around the clock if I win." He stated: "Vodka is the national drink. It will be cheap when I come to power, and it will be sold at all retail outlets." In 1991, he said he would provide the leadership needed to revive the Russian economy.

During the 1993 legislative elections, LDPR believed that privatization should be limited to small or medium-sized business, land should remain under state ownership, industry should be state-controlled and all forms of “speculative trading” should be prohibited.

During the mid-1990s, the LDPR platform was very vague on economic policy, giving no clear indication as to whether it championed a move towards either socialism or capitalism. Instead, the party platform declared that it aimed "to create conditions in the country for the free exercise of the creative powers of the populations inhabiting it, and the assiduous utilization of the natural resources of our country." The LDPR platform also stated that "the aim of the LDPR's economic policy is to create a worthy and happy life of dignity and prosperity for every inhabitant of Russia–gradually without 'revolutionary leaps' and convolutions...without any prompting, or granting of enslaving credit, 'from the outside'." The LDPR advertised that its economic program would bring a supposed "100% improvement" to the lives of Russians.

In his 2018 campaign, Zhirinovsky pledged to crack down on oligarchs if elected president. He additionally proposed restricting speculative investments in housing. Zhirinovsky also proposed removing all restrictions on travel abroad for those with debt. He also proposed banning private debt collection activities, arguing that the exaction of debts owed should be carried out through the legal system and not by private individuals. Additionally, he proposed redenominating the ruble and nationalizing large business chains.

=== Family and marriage ===
During his 1991 campaign, he promised to provide women with husbands.

In 2013, Zhirinovsky declared that the Northern Caucasus should be surrounded with barbed-wire fence and that its residents should have to pay a tax if they have more than two children (a two-child policy).

In his 2018 campaign, Zhirinvosky advocated banning marriages of convenience. He also argued that children should only be born with the consent and will of both parents.

=== Government reform ===
==== Governmental structure of the RSFSR ====
In his 1991 presidential campaign, Zhirinovsky vowed to stop the disintegration of the USSR, indicating intention to keep the RSFSR as part of the Soviet Union and halt the decline of the Soviet government. His 1991 campaign program vowed that he would reject the policy by which Russia and the center (i.e. Moscow leadership of the USSR) are placed in opposition with each other.

In his 1991 campaign, Zhirinovsky vowed to adopt a new constitution and a new system of legislation. Zhirinovsky promised to "resolve national problems as they are resolved throughout the world, that is, by rejecting the division of the country on the basis of ethnic territories and switching instead to a system of division into regions and providences [sic]".

During his 1991 campaign, he proposed ending ethnic conflicts by partitioning Russia into gubernii (similar to US states) rather than national-territorial regions. He also proposed creating highly centralized government authority.

==== Governmental structure of the Russian Federation ====
Throughout the existence of the Russian Federation, Zhirinovsky took multiple positions on the governmental structure of the Russian government.

Zhirinovsky was an ardent critic of the modern state structure of Russia. In particular, Zhirinovsky has criticized the Federal structure of Russia.

In 2003, he proposed merging the then 89 regions of Russia into just 15 provinces with leaders directly appointed by the president. During his 2012 campaign, Zhirinovsky stated that he believed that "Russia should be a centralized state without regional princelings". In his 2018 campaign, Zhirinovsky argued that Russia should be a unitary country that consists of 40 Governorates.

In its 1995 legislative campaign, the LDPR promised to preserve Russia's multi-party system if it were to come into power.

In 2003, Zhirinovsky proposed getting rid of the Federation Council which he called "irrelevant".

Zhirinovsky also proposed reducing the number of members of the State Duma from 450 to 200 and abolishing the Federation Council in order to establish a unicameral parliament.

In August 2014, he argued that Russia should abolish political parties and adopt an autocratic system in which the leader would be chosen by the "five to six thousand wisest people" in the country.

In 2018, after the conclusion of that year's presidential election, he stated that he believed that by 2024 Russia would transition from an elected presidency to an appointed state council.

==== Presidential authority ====
In the early 1990s, Zhirinovsky made clear his desire to bring a dictatorship to Russia. He long advocated for the centralization of power.

In contrast with the Communist Party (which was critical towards a "strong presidency"), the Liberal Democratic Party heavily supported having a "strong presidency". Zhirinovsky and the LDPR advocated for strong executive authority and a weak legislature. Zhirinovsky sought to enact a strong presidential authority, in essence, a dictatorial/autocratic leadership. The LDPR strongly supported the authority of a president to dissolve parliament, to call for new elections, and to veto laws. In 2003, he proposed establishing an "authoritarian regime" in Russia.

In his 2012 presidential campaign, Zhirinovsky reversed his previous positions, proposing that several presidential powers be transferred to the Duma. He also proposed that a new office of "tzar" be created to serve as Russia's ceremonial head of state. In his 2018 campaign, Zhirinovsky reverted to his earlier stance on presidential authority, pledging to create a "brutal dictatorship" if he was elected president.

=== Healthcare ===
In 1995, the LDPR promised that they would increase the lifespans of Russians.

In 2006, Zhirinovsky's proposed solution to deal with the global spread of H5N1 (also known as "bird flu") was to "shoot all the birds" migrating into Russia.

In the 2010s, Zhirinovsky recommended that ways the general public could improve their health included abstaining from alcohol and tobacco, eating less meat, and having less sex.

In his 2018 campaign, Zhirinovsky proposed banning the import of genetically modified organisms, which he blamed for health maladies and disease.

=== Immigration ===
Zhirinovsky expressed hostility towards Asian immigrants.

In his 2008 campaign, Zhirinovsky spoke of locking down and closing all of Russia's borders immediately after the election. Zhirinovsky declared: "If you think that these are the actions of a police state, well, be my guest. I promise that I will take these actions."

In 2013, Zhirinovsky recommended for all illegal immigrants to leave Russia within a three-year timeframe.

In 2013, Zhirinovsky advocated stricter rules regarding the employment of migrant/foreign workers.

In September 2016, he proposed building a border wall and banning Muslims from entering Russia.

=== Law enforcement ===
The LDPR's platform has proclaimed the primacy of law.

During his 1991 presidential campaign, Zhirinovsky vowed to adopt effective legislation to defend citizens from the criminal elements. Zhirinovsky vowed to abolish the so-called "war of laws" in which local authorities were passing laws conflicting with those adopted by the central government in Moscow, and vice versa. He also promised to ruthlessly punish crime, including through on-the-spot executions without trial or investigation (summary executions).

In the mid-1990s, LDPR sought to launch a dedicated war on crime, targeting all of the several-thousand known gangs in Russia. He proposed creating martial law courts that would carry out summary executions. During the 1993 legislative elections, Zhirinovsky claimed that Russia would see a major increase in national revenues as a result of his proposals to eliminate crime.

In his 2018 campaign, Zhirinovsky proposed establishing martial law courts across the whole country, similar to what Pyotr Stolypin did when he was Prime Minister of Russia. He also proposed implementing a general amnesty and humanizing the Criminal Code. He proposed that prisons should only be populated by murderers, robbers, drug dealers, big scammers and thieves.

Despite his tough-on-crime stance, Zhirinovsky and his son Igor Lebedev have been accused of selling LDPR seats in the Duma to shady businesspeople in a ploy to help shield the businessmen from criminal prosecution via parliamentary immunity. Zhirinvosky has had a reputation for being involved in corruption.

=== Media censorship ===
In a 1994 interview with The Washington Post, Zhirinovsky threatened to prosecute and imprison journalists who "interfere with my private life" and "inflict moral damage on me."

Zhirinovsky directly threatened harm to reporters who asked him unflattering questions. For instance, on live television in April 2014 Zhirinovsky ordered his aides to rape a journalist who was six-months pregnant.

In his 2018 campaign, Zhirinovsky pledged that, if elected, he would restrict the amount of negative news coverage the media would be allowed to broadcast at a maximum of 10% of their total news coverage. He would also issue a fine for every foreign word that the media uttered.

=== Religious freedom ===
Although of Jewish heritage (which he long denied), Zhirinovsky had a history of adopting antisemitic stances. Zhirinovsky is also reported to have once declared, "Jewish children are going to school, while our children are hungry and forlorn. If you vote for me, it will stop."

Zhirinovsky proposed placing barbed wired fences along areas of southern Russia (particularly the North Caucasian republics of Chechnya, Ingushetia, and Dagestan) where significant Muslim populations live and banning Muslims from entering Russia.

=== Taxes and funding ===
Appealing towards ethnic resentments, in one of his televised monologues during his 1996 presidential campaign, Zhirinovsky pledged to end policies that were being carried out "at the expense of the Russian people." Zhirinovsky alleged that the ethnically defined regions in the Russian Federation, such as the republics of Tatarstan, Yakutiya and the Northern Caucasus, paid less in taxes and yet received more money from the federal government than other regions did (this was untrue at the time, but later became a matter of policy in Chechnya due to the separatism in the republic). Zhirinovsky said,

Today, we Russians live worse, are poorer, and we die sooner. We have fewer rights. The majority of children at train stations are–who? Russians. The majority of girls walking the streets in Europe are–who? Russians. The majority of dead soldiers are–who? Russians. The majority of scientists who have left–Russians. The majority of teachers and doctors who aren’t paid their salaries–just the same, it’s primarily in the Russian regions. It’s a war against the Russian people.

=== Welfare ===
During the 1993 legislative election campaign, Zhirinovsky promised that he would provide cheaper vodka to men and better lingerie to women.

In his 2018 campaign, Zhirinovsky supported increasing the government assistance provided to single mothers.

== Foreign policy ==
Zhirinovsky's 1991 presidential campaign program vowed to alter the direction of foreign policy in order to allow all necessary material resources to enter Russia and to guarantee the security of foreign investment. Zhirinovsky also vowed to demand that foreign nations repay or refinance loans they received from both the Soviet authority and Russia.

In the fall of 1991, commenting on what he feared to be a future in which Russia had been destroyed by democratic rule would look like, Zhirinovsky predicted, "Iran and Afghanistan can drag Central Asia over to its side, Turkey is settling scores with the Transcaucusus; Poland and Romania will take care of Ukraine and Moldova. That leaves an embittered Russia which will torment itself with China and Japan, with the Yakuts and Buriats, with the Volga Region, in an eternal knot of insoluble problems. There are nuclear weapons, and the military factories, and the tanks, and the disgruntled army, returning home from all over : from Germany, the Baltics, Transcaucusia. And all of them are going to Russia."

In 1993, Zhirinovsky stated his belief that Russia should not accept financial aid from the west, declaring, "Russia without much effort could become a normal civilized state and does not need anyone's help. We don't need humanitarian aid. We Russians don't need leftovers and hand-me-downs."

The Liberal Democratic Party's 1996 platform focused more extensively on foreign policy than the Communist Party's (and its candidate Zyuganov's) platform did. Additionally, the Liberal Democratic Party's foreign policy stances were more extreme than those of the Communist Party.

In a late-January 1996, speech Zhirinovsky delivered to the Council of Europe in Strasbourg, France, Zhirinovsky derided the organization as being a "slime pond for defunct politicians entitled to free meals." He remarked that a rejection of Russia's then-pending membership application would drive Russian voters into his party's ranks. Zhirinovsky was believed to consider the former Central and East European satellite states of the Soviet Union to be part of the Russian sphere of influence. The LDPR sought to end all Russian economic aid to other countries.

Zhirinovsky advocated greatly expanding Russia's territory, including Alaska and Finland. In the early 1990s, a frequent backdrop he used for speeches and press events was a map of Russia expanding east through Alaska and west through Finland. Zhirinovsky had a penchant for geopolitical domination. He believed that it was Russia's destiny to dominate the largely Muslim territories between the former Soviet republics and the Indian Ocean. Zhirnovsky stated a strong desire to remove Muslim influence in the world.

In 1994, while expressing his desire for Russia to capture Islamic nations such as Iran, Turkey, and Saudi Arabia for their oil supplies, Zhirinovsky stated that "the whole world should think that if Russia needs it, it is for the best." Zhirinovsky declared that "the majority of mankind is interested in dissecting the Muslim world. The Muslim peril has to be eliminated." He stated that he believed that the Russian army's "last march to the south would lead it to the shores of the Indian Ocean and to the Mediterranean, and mean liberation for 20 million Kurds, hundreds of thousands of Baluchis (and) Pushtuns." He also declared that "the ringing of the Russian Orthodox bells on the shores of the Indian Ocean and the Mediterranean would be the sound of peace for the people of the region." In 1994, Zhirnovsky wrote that "Russia reaching the shores of the Indian Ocean and Mediterranean Sea is a task that will be the salvation of the Russian nation."

Zhirinovsky believes that Russia's possession of nuclear weapons (and the threat of their use) would prevent other nations from stopping expansionist moves on their part.

Zhirinovsky forged relations with far-right and ultranationalist movements abroad, such as the National Revival of Poland, German People's Union, Jean-Marie Le Pen's French National Front. Zhirinovsky was friendly with foreign dictators, such as Iraq's Saddam Hussein.

Zhirinovsky and his party have opposed NATO expansion, particularly that involving former Soviet republics.

In March 2000, Zhirinovsky declared the importance of Russia establishing a military bloc to counter NATO. He stated that such a bloc would "consist of the military forces of Russia, Belarus, and the Republic of Yugoslavia. All Orthodox people should unite, since the Western civilization has united against them" as have "the Muslims from the east and south." He also quickly added Ukraine and Bulgaria as nations that he believed would be part of such a bloc.

In his 2018 campaign, Zhirinovsky expressed intentions to pursue an aggressive policy, but normalize relations with the West.

Zhirinovsky has promised to return Russia's borders to that of 1985 Soviet boundaries. During his 2018 campaign, he stated that he would accomplish this by demanding referendums in former Soviet republics.

=== Baltic states ===
Zhirinovsky expressed a strong desire for reuniting Russia with former Soviet states in the Baltics. In June 1991, Zhirinovsky said he would be willing to allow Lithuania independence, but only because he believed that Lithuanians would quickly discover that "nobody in Europe will buy Lithuanian cheese," thus Lithuanians would not remain independent very long. He also stated that he would only allow an independent Lithuania that is "a small independent state, an enclave." However, in August he expressed plans to annex Estonia, Latvia and Lithuania and have them form a single gubernii of Russia.

In October 1991, Zhirinovsky expressed a willingness to take far more extreme measures, threatening to bury nuclear waste along Russia's border with the Baltics, and blow radiation into the Baltics utilizing fans. Zhirinovsky declared,

The Baltics are Russian land. I will destroy you. I will start burying nuclear waste in the border zone of Smolensk Oblast; the Semipalatinsk [nuclear testing grounds] will be transferred to your area. You Lithuanians will die of disease and radiation. I will remove the Russians and the Poles. I am God. I am a tyrant. There will be no Lithuanians, Latvians, or Estonians in the Baltics. I will act like Hitler in 1932 [sic]

In December 1993, Zhirinovsky stated that he believed that Estonia would be forced back into union with Russia by "economic means." He elaborated: "If they don't behave, we'll switch off their lights." In the same month, Zhirinovsky expressed a willingness to allow an independent Baltic state, but one that is "reduced to the size of Liechtenstein".

In January 1994, Le Monde published a Zhirinovsky-autographed map that showed the Estonian capital, Tallinn, and Lithuania's former capital of Kaunas, as free city-states, with the rest of the Baltics as a part of Russia. Around the time of his 2008 campaign, Zhirinovsky encouraged ethnic Russians living in the Baltics to pursue separatist movements.

In August 2014, Zhirinovsky threatened to carpet bomb the Baltics.

=== Bulgaria ===
In January 1994, Zhirinovsky was expelled from Bulgaria for insulting their president, Zhelyu Zhelev. Zhirinovsky had insisted that Zhelev needed to resign from office and be sent away to Siberia and that Zhirinovsky's former economic advisor Svetozar Stoilov, who had been involved in founding a Bulgarian Liberal Democratic Party in 1989 led by Veselin Koshev, should replace him as president. Other comments Zhirinovsky made at this time included an insistence Thrace and historical Macedonian territory needed to be returned by Greece to the control of Bulgaria, as did the Romanian northern part of Dobruja.

=== China ===
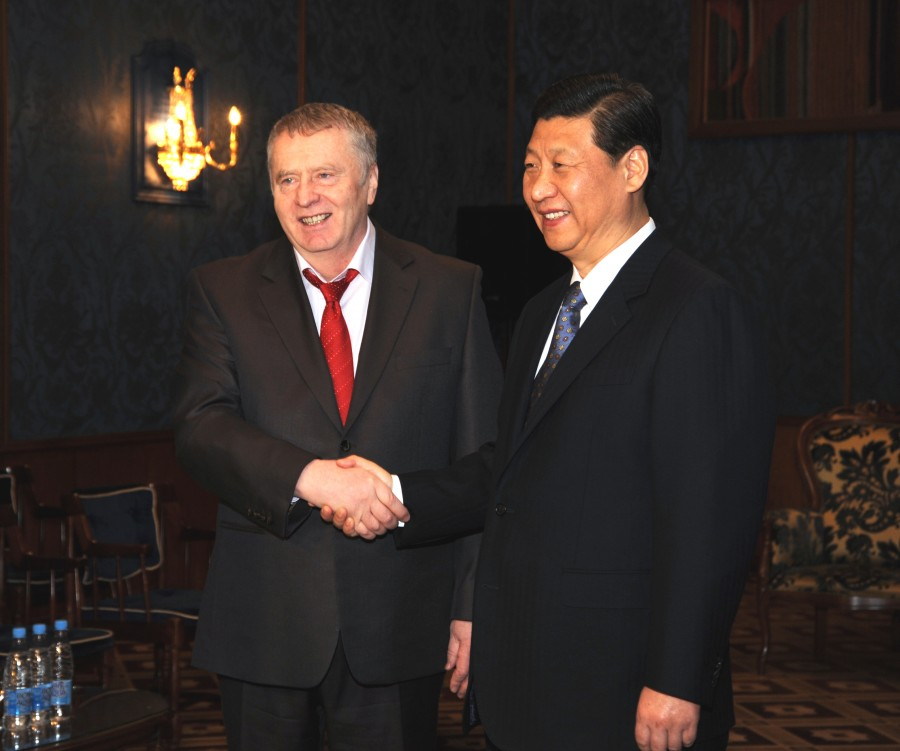
Zhirinovsky meeting with Chinese Vice President Xi Jinping in 2010 during his visit to Russia

On 24 March 2010, Zhirinovsky met in Moscow with Xi Jinping, then member of the Standing Committee of the Politburo of the Chinese Communist Party and Vice President of the People's Republic of China, and Wang Jiarui, Minister of the International Liaison Department of the Chinese Communist Party, who were visiting Russia. Zhirinovsky expressed his support for the position of the CCP on Xinjiang and Tibet, as well as socialism with Chinese characteristics. In an interview with China Central Television (CCTV) in December 2017, Zhirinovsky expressed his approval of the Chinese Communist Party’s leadership of China: "Today, under the leadership of Xi Jinping, China has made great achievements, and their ideology has been written in the Constitution of the Communist Party of China. The Chinese Communists have summarised it as Xi Jinping’s new era of socialism with Chinese characteristics. China has developed rapidly, and it can be said that it has made great achievements. Millions of people have been lifted out of poverty. The industry has become more powerful. The renminbi has become an important international currency."

=== Georgia ===
In 1994, Zhirinovsky wrote, "Georgia is an impediment to us. We must change our border."

=== Finland ===
Zhirinovsky suggested Russia should expand its territory by annexing Finland. Particularly in the early 1990s, he frequently suggested that Finland (which had been a part of the Russian Empire prior to 1917) should be returned to Russian rule.

In May 1991, during his first presidential campaign, he promised to return Finland to Russian control as soon as he was inaugurated. After he lost the election, he continued to use the slogan "a Russian Finland" at rallies. In May 1992 he declared to a Finnish reporter that he saw the future of Finland "only as a component of a renewed powerful Russia." In response to this, Finnish defense minister Elisabeth Rehn responded to this by saying, "Zhirinovsky is regarded in Finland as being something of a harmless loudmouth, but that he is not. I see the national chauvinism stirred up by Zhirinovsky as a threat to Finland."

=== France ===
In 1995, Zhirinovsky sent France a letter of congratulations about their nuclear tests.

In a February 2015 speech, Zhirinovsky advocated burning down Paris as well as the cities of other European countries.

=== Germany ===
In his 1991 presidential campaign, Zhirinovsky promised that he would feed Russia within 72 hours of taking office by using military force to coerce Germany into supplying them with food, saying, "I'll bring troops into former East Germany —a million and a half people, they'll rattle their weapons, including nuclear ones, and everything will appear."

In the early 1990s, Zhirinovsky issued threats to nuke Germany. In late 1993, he stated that he would nuke Germany if they ever interfered in Russian affairs. Zhirinovsky made comments stating that he preferred to see a Germany that was "as small as Austria". These comments are believed to have spurred the dissolution of an allegiance that once existed between the LDPR and the far-right German People's Union.

In February 2015, Zhirinovsky advocated the destruction of Germany.

=== Greece ===
In January 1994, Zhirinovsky insisted that Thrace and historical Macedonian territory needed to be returned by Greece to the control of Bulgaria. Zhirinovsky once mentioned that "Turks will be eating kebabs in Ankara and we will create a Greater Greece" and also that Istanbul would soon become Constantinople again.

=== Iran ===
Zhirinovsky once proposed removing restrictions on arms sales to Iran.

Zhirinovsky also, previously, indicated a desire for Russia to capture Iranian territory. In 2019, Zhirinovsky called for Russia and Iran to establish a joint military base.

=== India ===
In 1995, Zhirinovsky condemned the partition of India during a visit to the country and called for India to reclaim the lost territory. He also called for donating Russian arms to India, greater imports of "high quality Indian foodstuffs and consumer goods" instead of "third class goods from Muslim countries", and expressed support for the Indian position on the Kashmir conflict.

=== Israel ===
Zhirinovsky and the LDPR were initially anti-Zionist and frequently espoused antisemitic conspiracy theories about "Zionist plots". LDPR has actively courted antisemitic voters. He denied allegations that he was a member of Shalom, a branch of the Anti-Zionist Committee of the Soviet Public.

Zhirinovsky visited Israel for the first time in 2003. An LDPR affiliate party was also established that year in Israel to represent Israelis of Russian descent. In 2004, Zhirinovsky called for a "common front" between Russia and Israel against Islamic extremism.

During a trip to Israel in 2006, Zhirinovsky declared his support for closer ties with Israel and stated that "Russia will never allow any kind of violence against Israel".

=== Japan ===
In the early 1990s, Zhirinovsky issued threats to nuke Japan. He was reported to have, in the early 1990s, remarked, "I would bomb the Japanese. I would sail our large navy around their small island, and if they so much as cheeped, I would nuke them."

In late 1993, he stated that he would nuke Japan if they ever interfered in Russian affairs.

Zhirinovsky once proposed selling Russia's claim to the disputed Kuril Islands to Japan for 50 billion USD.

=== North Korea ===
Zhirinovsky visited North Korea at October 1994 with a LDPR delegation. He meet at the Pyongyang International Airport with Hwang Jang-yop.

In April 2017, Zhirinovsky went to the North Korean Embassy in Russia to express his solidarity with the leadership of North Korea against the US.

=== Poland ===
In August 2014, Zhirinovsky threatened to carpet-bomb Poland.

=== Serbia ===
Zhirinovsky vocally supported the Federal Republic of Yugoslavia and its allies during the Bosnian War. In January 1994, Zhirinovsky declared: "We are supporting the Serbs and our standpoint is that the Serb lands--the Serbian Republic and the Republic of Serbian Krajina should be within the Republic of Serbia." He also declared that he would be "happy if Russia and Serbia had a common border."

In 2000, Zhirinovsky stated that he supported a military alliance between the Russia, Belarus, and Yugoslavia, as a counter to NATO.

=== Turkey ===
Zhirinovsky once wrote that Russia should annex all Turkish countries because, the Russian soldier "must clean his boots in the Indian Ocean".

By 2008, Zhirinovsky was supporting Russia's efforts to lure Turkey away from Western alliance. Zhirinovsky advised the Turkish to "Learn Russian, don't look to the West, look north. The EU doesn't want you, but we want you. We'll give you gas, you give us nuts!" Deriding NATO (of which Turkey is a member) as an "imperialist club", Zhirinvosky urged Turkey to forget about Europe and construct an alliance with Russia.

In November 2015, after an incident in which a Russian bomber was shot down by a Turkish Air Force F-16 fighter jet after an air-space violation, he stated in a speech to the Duma that Russia must detonate a nuclear bomb on the Bosphorus to create a 10 meters high tsunami wave that would wipe out at least 9 million Istanbul residents.

In 2018, Zhirinovsky attended President Recep Tayyip Erdoğan's inauguration ceremony and praised the improved ties between Russia and Turkey. Zhirinovsky subsequently claimed Erdoğan had expressed interest in withdrawal from NATO.

=== Ukraine ===
In the 1990s, Zhirinovsky rejected Ukrainian independence, believing Ukraine to be a part of the Russian state.

In 2013, when asked about former Ukrainian prime minister Yulia Tymoshenko, Zhirinovsky said, "Yulia Tymoshenko, I'm sorry, is a woman. I don't like them, as it's easier to persuade a woman. [...] Women are more compliant, and it's dangerous."

Zhirinovsky strongly supported the 2014 Russian annexation of Crimea. When, in the wake of the annexation, franchises of the fast-food restaurant McDonald's were unable to continue because they had been cut off by their Ukrainian franchisor, Zhirinovsky suggested that McDonald's "should be evicted from Russia" for the affront.

In July 2014, amidst an armed insurgency in Eastern Ukraine, the Ukrainian Interior Ministry launched criminal proceedings against Zhirinovsky and Communist Party of the Russian Federation leader Gennady Zyuganov for "financing actions aimed at changing the boundaries of the territory and the state border of Ukraine".

In May 2015, Zhirinovsky declared that former president of Georgia (and then-governor of Odesa, Ukraine) Mikheil Saakashvili, should be killed: "We will shoot all of your governors, starting with Saakashvili, then they'll be afraid. And there will be a different situation in Europe and Ukraine. ... Let's aim at Berlin, Brussels, London, and Washington." He then said Ukrainian political prisoner Nadiya Savchenko should be shot and hanged in Belgrade.

In July 2017, Zhirinovsky remarked that “the final result” to unrest in Ukraine would be that the country would be divided after many rounds of negotiations. He remarked that the "south-eastern Ukraine and the Russian population will go to Russia, but the north-west will become a nationalist state of seven to eight million people … will become a member of NATO and the European Union.”

In February 2018, Zhirinovsky proposed deploying a nuclear bomb in Ukraine in order to kill Petro Poroshenko remarking that Russia should drop "a tiny bomb. Not a big Hiroshima, but a small one. Right there where the residence of Ukrainian President Poroshenko is."

In a speech on 27 December 2021, Zhirinovsky appeared to almost predict the day of the Russian invasion of Ukraine of 24 February 2022, stating: "At 4 a.m. on February 22, you will feel [our new policy]. I would like 2022 to be a peaceful year. But I love the truth, for 70 years I have been telling the truth. It will not be peaceful. It will be a year when Russia becomes great again."

=== United Kingdom ===
Zhirinovsky stated that the United Kingdom has been Russia's "worst enemy of the last few centuries".

Around the time of his 2008 campaign, Zhirinovsky suggested dropping nukes into the Atlantic in order to cause a tsunami to flood Great Britain. Around the same time, Zhirinovsky organized an anti-British rally outside of the Embassy of the United Kingdom in Moscow.

During the 2019 United Kingdom general election, Zhirinovsky and the LDPR endorsed Conservative Party leader Boris Johnson in order to "quickly bring Britain out of the European Union".

=== United States ===
Zhirinovsky held a very hostile stance towards the United States, blaming it for all of the world's wars and diseases, particularly AIDS.

In 1991, he threatened to, if the United States would not stop supporting separatist movements in the Soviet Union, establish an independent state within United States territory populated exclusively by African Americans.

Zhirinovsky regarded American president Bill Clinton to be a weak president. Zhirinovsky was bitter that Clinton failed to meet with him during his trip to Moscow in early 1994. However, Zhirinovsky had also suggested that he would be able to get along well with Clinton if they met. Zhirinovsky made the suggestion that he would take the American president to one of Russia's brothels and make him forget all about his wife Hillary.

In his 1996 campaign, Zhirinovsky's broader foreign policy objectives would require the United States' position in the world to be undermined in order to restructure the existing world order.

Zhirinovsky and his party opposed the START II treaty, claiming that it made Russian a secondary state. According to Zhirinovsky, his party only supported agreements "that do not humiliate, insult, or limit Russia as a great nation."

Zhirinovsky believed that there was far too much American culture on Russian television, particularly violent programming and advertising.

In the 1990s, Zhirinovsky intended to negotiate an arrangement to purchase Alaska back from the United States. He continued to encourage Russia to take back Alaska.

In 2002, Zhirinovsky made an, evidently drunken, speech against America's war in Iraq (a country led by Zhirinovsky's personal ally Saddam Hussein) in which he issued particularly harsh and profane suggestions about the United States and its leaders. He referred to the country as a “second-hand goods store” filled with “cocksuckers, handjobbers, and faggots.” He issued an outlandish threat, declaring that he would alter the gravitational field of the Earth in order to sink the entirety of the United States into the oceans. Zhirinovsky proclaimed that American president George W. Bush (son of former president George H. W. Bush) had "daddy issues" and was an ignoramous who could not count or say much. He issued controversial statements about then-National Security Advisor Condoleezza Rice saying,

She is a black whore who needs a good cock. Send her here, one of our divisions will make her happy in the barracks one night. She will choke on Russian sperm as it will be leaking out of her ears... until she crawls to the US embassy in Moscow on her knees.

In 2006, he again disparaged Condoleezza Rice (by then America's Secretary of State) by issuing sexist and ageist remarks saying,

Condoleezza Rice released a coarse anti-Russian statement. This is because she is a single woman who has no children. She loses her reason because of her late single status…If she has no man by her side at her age, he will never appear. Even if she had a whole selection of men to choose from she would stay single because her soul and heart have hardened… Condoleezza Rice needs a company of soldiers. She needs to be taken to barracks where she would be satisfied. On the other hand, she can hardly be satisfied because of her age.

Zhirinovsky thought poorly of Bush's successor, Barack Obama, despite endorsing him in 2008. Zhirinovsky was known to have told obscene jokes and made derisive remarks about Obama. Zhirinovsky condemned the 2012 reelection of Obama, saying that it signaled the beginning of a "slow self-isolation" for the United States and that indicated that the United States would be "doomed to stagnation". In early 2014, Zhirinovsky suggested that Obama should divorce his wife Michelle so that he could become a more effective leader, arguing that national leaders should be celibate and focus only on their job. However, later that year, Zhirinovsky expressed admiration for Michelle Obama's focus on improving the nutrition in the lunches provided to students at American schools, and even expressed his interest in having a dialogue with Michelle Obama about the subject of school lunches and childhood nutrition. In 2014, he also argued that Barack Obama should be stripped of his Nobel Peace Prize. That same year he also threatened to attack Washington, D.C.

Zhirinovsky was additionally friends with former Ku Klux Klan Grand Wizard David Duke, whom he once termed his "favourite American politician".

During the 2016 US presidential election, Zhirinovsky actively supported Donald Trump as candidate. Trump was running against, and ultimately defeated Hillary Clinton, wife of former president Bill Clinton. Zhirinovsky had voiced his personal disdain for both Clintons since the early 1990s. Zhirinovsky's support of Trump was due to the fact that, in Russia, Trump was often compared with Zhirinovsky, mainly because of the similarity of their style of performance. Zhirinovsky said that he hoped to improve relations between the US and Russia if Trump became President. Zhirinovsky promised that, in the case of a Trump victory, he would drink champagne for him. After the victory of Donald Trump in the election, the Liberal Democratic Party organized a celebratory banquet for 100 thousand rubles (US$1.5 thousand). However, after the US missile strike on Syria in April 2017, Zhirinovsky said that Trump's foreign policy does not match the one his voters supported, and declared that he would drink champagne to celebrate a Trump impeachment.

In his 2018 campaign, Zhirinovsky promised that he would be able to normalize relations with the United States.

By the end of Trump's presidency, Zhirinovsky had soured on him. However, Zhirinovsky once again expressed support for Trump during the January 6 United States Capitol attack, stating, "Be brave Donald. We're with you, you'll get help from abroad."

=== Trade ===
During the 1993 legislative elections, Zhirinovsky proposed ceasing assistance to other countries in order to invest more funds in improving Russia's economy. He also advocated increasing arms sales abroad in order to raise Russia's national revenue.

In his 2012 presidential campaign, Zhirinovsky proposed implementing agricultural import and export bans.

In his 2018 campaign, he argued that all of Russian citizens should have access to its gas before any of it is shipped abroad.

== Military policy ==
Zhirinovsky was an ardent backer of Russia's defense industry. From its founding, LDPR sought to enact a military policy that would fund a strong military force. The party sought to an end to the conversion of military industry to civilian uses. It also sought to transition the nation's military into a fully professional force by ending conscription.

In the late 1980s, Zhirinovsky spoke at rallies, delivering speeches urging a withdrawal from the Soviet–Afghan War. He criticized Mikhail Gorbachev, whom he had previously praised.

During his 1991 presidential campaign, he vowed to prevent the disintegration of the Soviet army. In this campaign, Zhirinovsky advocated gradually eliminating the policy of conscription, transitioning Russia's military into an entirely professional force. He also pledged: "If I win, I will raise the monetary compensation for an officer to four thousand rubles." He vowed to fund this by selling arms to other nations and by using the hard currency which members of the Soviet military received for serving in the United Nations' troops. He additionally promised to provide land to returning troops.

In the 1990s, the LDPR voiced its intent to avoid using the Russian military to solve the problems of other nations, arguing that this lowers the prestige of the military.

In the 1990s, Zhirnonvsky planned to use the military as a tool to unify the nation and strengthen the power of the LDPR, and intended to bridge the divide between the civilian and military populations by uniting both around a common "foreign enemy", such as the United States or "Zionist" ideology.

Zhirinovsky had a tendency to make inflammatory and frightening statements about military hostility and aggression. Many regarded Zhirinivosky's attitude towards war to be frighteningly cavalier.

During the 1990s, Zhirinovsky supported military action in Chechnya. In fact, in his speech at the 1996 LDPR congress, Zhirinovsky argued Russia should drop napalm on Chechnya.

In 1994, Zhirinvosky declared, "The new military can be reborn only in the course of a military operation. An army degenerates in the barracks. It needs a goal, a great task. It needs to exercise its muscle." That year he also wrote: "New armed forces are only born in combat operations. You cannot build an army in commissariats and barracks."
