= 1990s in medicine =

Listicle of events associated with medicine in the 90s

This is a list of events associated with medicine in the 1990s.

== 1990 ==
- 1990–1991 Philadelphia measles outbreak
- Kosovo student poisoning

=== October ===
- 01: The Human Genome Project officially begins.
- 08: The Nobel Prize in Physiology or Medicine is jointly awarded to Joseph E. Murray and E. Donnall Thomas for their discoveries concerning “organ and cell transplantation in the treatment of human disease”.

== 1991 ==
- The Nobel Prize in Physiology or Medicine is jointly awarded to Erwin Neher and Bert Sakmann for their discoveries concerning “the function of single ion channels in cells”.

== 1992 ==
- 1992–1993 Jack in the Box E. coli outbreak
- Aerolíneas Argentinas Flight 386
- The Nobel Prize in Physiology or Medicine is jointly awarded to Edmond H. Fischer and Edwin G. Krebs for their discoveries concerning “reversible protein phosphorylation as a biological regulatory mechanism”.

== 1993 ==
- 1993 Four Corners hantavirus outbreak
- 1993 Milwaukee cryptosporidiosis outbreak

=== October ===
- 11: The Nobel Prize in Physiology or Medicine is jointly awarded to Richard J. Roberts and Phillip A. Sharp for their discovery of “split genes”.

== 1994 ==
- 1994 plague in India
- United Kingdom BSE outbreak

=== October ===
- 10: The Nobel Prize in Physiology or Medicine is jointly awarded to Alfred G. Gilman and Martin Rodbell for their discovery of “G-proteins and the role of these proteins in signal transduction in cells”.

== 1995 ==
=== October ===
- 09: The Nobel Prize in Physiology or Medicine is jointly awarded to Edward B. Lewis, Christiane Nüsslein-Volhard and Eric F. Wieschaus for their discoveries concerning “the genetic control of early embryonic development”.

== 1996 ==
- 1996 Odwalla E. coli outbreak

=== October ===
- 07: The Nobel Prize in Physiology or Medicine is jointly awarded to Peter C. Doherty and Rolf M. Zinkernagel for their discoveries concerning "the specificity of the cell mediated immune defence"

== 1997 ==
=== October ===
- 06: The Nobel Prize in Physiology or Medicine is awarded to Stanley B. Prusiner for his discovery of “Prions – a new biological principle of infection”.

== 1998 ==
- 1998 Winter Olympics flu epidemic

=== September ===
- 23: The first successful hand transplant is performed.
- 29: The Malaysia Nipah virus outbreak begins, leading to 265 confirmed cases and 105 deaths. The outbreak began in pig farms and caused the near collapse of Malaysia's pig farming industry. The outbreak was originally misidentified as being that of Japanese encephalitis, but was later discovered to be a previously unknown pathogen dubbed Nipah virus. One million pigs were culled to stop the outbreak.

=== October ===
- 12: The Nobel Prize in Physiology or Medicine is jointly awarded to Robert F. Furchgott, Louis Ignarro and Ferid Murad for their discoveries concerning “nitric oxide as a signalling molecule in the cardiovascular system”.

== 1999 ==
- 1999 Bovenkarspel legionellosis outbreak

=== October ===
- 11: The Nobel Prize in Physiology or Medicine is awarded to Günter Blobel for his discovery that “proteins have intrinsic signals that govern their transport and localization in the cell”.

=== December ===
- 09: The hormone Ghrelin is discovered and named.

== See also ==
- 2000s in medicine
- Timeline of medicine and medical technology
