= Global spread of H5N1 in 2005 =

Pandemic threat

Cumulative Human Cases of and Deaths from H5N1 As of April 11, 2007
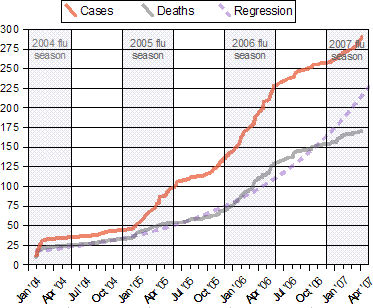
- Notes: Source WHO Confirmed Human Cases of H5N1; "[T]he incidence of human cases peaked, in each of the three years in which cases have occurred, during the period roughly corresponding to winter and spring in the northern hemisphere. If this pattern continues, an upsurge in cases could be anticipated starting in late 2006 or early 2007." Avian influenza – epidemiology of human H5N1 cases reported to WHO; The regression curve for deaths is y = a + e^{k x}, and is shown extended through the end of April, 2007.

The global spread of (highly pathogenic) H5N1 in birds is considered a significant pandemic threat.

While prior H5N1 strains have been known, they were significantly different from the current H5N1 strain on a genetic level, making the global spread of this new strain unprecedented. The current H5N1 strain is a fast-mutating, highly pathogenic avian influenza virus (HPAI) found in multiple bird species. It is both epizootic (an epidemic in non-humans) and panzootic (a disease affecting animals of many species especially over a wide area). Unless otherwise indicated, "H5N1" in this article refers to the recent highly pathogenic strain of H5N1.

In January 2005 an outbreak of avian influenza affected thirty three out of sixty four cities and provinces in Vietnam, leading to the forced killing of nearly 1.2 million poultry. Up to 140 million birds are believed to have died or been killed because of the outbreak. In April 2005 an unprecedented die-off began of over 6,000 migratory birds at Qinghai Lake in central China over three months. This strain of H5N1 is the same strain as is spread west by migratory birds over at least the next ten months. In August 2005 H5N1 spread to Kazakhstan, Mongolia and Russia. On September 30, 2005, David Nabarro, the newly appointed Senior United Nations System Coordinator for Avian and Human Influenza, warned the world that an outbreak of avian influenza could kill 5 to 150 million people. David Nabarro later stated that as the virus had spread to migratory birds, an outbreak could start in Africa or the Middle East. Later in 2005 H5N1 spread to Turkey, Romania, Croatia and Kuwait.

== January ==
- An outbreak of avian influenza affected thirty three out of sixty four cities and provinces in Vietnam, leading to the forced killing of nearly 1.2 million poultry. Up to 140 million birds are believed to have died or been killed because of the outbreak.

== February ==
- "Surveillance stepped up in province where Cambodia's first human avian influenza case was detected".

== March ==
- Vietnam and Thailand have seen several isolated cases where human-to-human transmission of the virus has been suspected in relatives of H5N1 patients, including transmission from an 11-year-old girl to two relatives, her mother, who died, and the girl's aunt.

== April ==
- "The Ministry of Health in Vietnam has provided WHO with official confirmation of an additional eight human cases of H5N1 avian influenza. Two of the cases were recently detected, between 2 and 8 April, in Hung Yen and Ha Tay Provinces, respectively. Both patients are alive. The other six cases are thought to have been detected prior to 2 April. WHO is seeking further details from the authorities on this six cases."

- There is an unprecedented die-off of over 6,000 migratory birds at Qinghai Lake in central China during April, May and June. This strain of H5N1 is the same strain as is spread west by migratory birds over at least the next ten months. "The RNA sequence of the Qinghai virus reveals that three of its eight genes are almost identical to those of a virus isolated from a chicken in Shantou in 2003. The other five genes resemble those of viruses found in southern China earlier in 2005, which belong to the "Z genotype" virus circulating across east Asia."

== May ==
- "Since January 2004, when human cases of H5N1 avian influenza were first reported in the current outbreak, 97 cases and 53 deaths have been reported in Vietnam, Thailand and Cambodia. Vietnam, with 76 cases and 37 deaths, has been the most severely affected country, followed by Thailand, with 17 cases and 12 deaths, and Cambodia, with 4 cases and 4 deaths."

== June ==
- "[T]esting of clinical specimens by international experts working in Vietnam provided further suggestive evidence of more widespread infection with the virus, raising the possibility of community-acquired infection" but "the detection of H5N1 in clinical specimens is technically challenging and prone to errors" so team members and supplies from "institutes in Australia, Canada, Hong Kong SAR, Japan, the United Kingdom, and the United States of America having extensive experience in the testing of avian influenza viruses in human clinical specimens" investigated and concluded that "no laboratory evidence suggesting that human infections are occurring with greater frequency or that the virus is spreading readily among humans."

== July ==
- A death in Jakarta was the first confirmed human fatality in Indonesia.
- On July 28, avian influenza was reported to have killed two more people in Vietnam, raising the death toll to sixty.

== August ==
August 3, 2005

- WHO said it was following closely reports from China that at least 38 people have died and more than 200 others have been made ill by a swine-borne virus in Sichuan Province. Sichuan Province, where infections with Streptococcus suis have been detected in pigs in a concurrent outbreak, has one of the largest pig populations in China. The outbreak in humans has some unusual features and is being closely followed by the WHO.

August 11, 2005

- An avian outbreak of H5N1 flu was confirmed in Kazakhstan and Mongolia, suggesting further spread of the virus.

August 22, 2005

- The virus was found in western Russia, marking its appearance in Europe. As a result, Dutch authorities ordered that free-range chickens would have to be kept indoors. EU officials chose not to impose a similar policy on member countries.

== September ==
September 30, 2005

- David Nabarro, the newly appointed Senior United Nations System Coordinator for Avian and Human Influenza, warned the world that an outbreak of avian influenza could kill 5 to 150 million people. Also, due to a bipartisan effort of the United States Senate, $4 billion was appropriated to develop vaccines and treatments for Avian influenza. David Nabarro stated that as the virus had spread to migratory birds, an outbreak could start in Africa or the Middle East.
- Agricultural ministers of Association of South East Asian Nations announced a three-year plan to counter the spread of the disease.

== October ==
October 13, 2005

- The EU Health Commissioner Markos Kyprianou confirmed that tests on the dead turkeys found on farms in Kiziksa, Turkey, showed that they had died from the H5N1 strain. Even before the test results were available, some 5,000 birds and poultry have been culled in the area. It is believed that the disease had spread from migratory birds that land at the Manyas bird sanctuary (a few miles from the infected farm) on their way to Africa.

October 15, 2005

- The British Veterinary Laboratory in Weybridge confirmed that the virus detected in Ciamurlia, Romania is H5N1.

October 19, 2005

- China announced a fresh outbreak of bird flu, saying 2,600 birds have died from the disease in Inner Mongolia. The deaths, at a farm near the region's capital of Hohhot, were due to the H5N1 strain, the Xinhua news agency said.

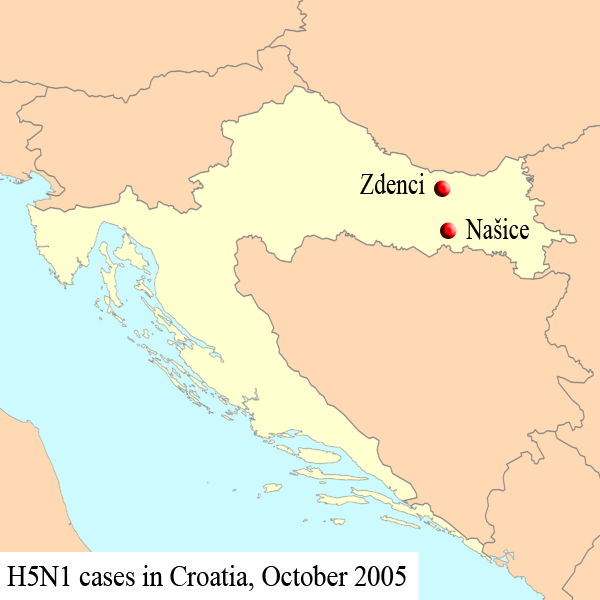
Locations of 2005 outbreaks in Croatia

October 26, 2005

- Croatia announced H5N1 strain was found in dead swans.

October 31, 2005

- Russia confirmed previously suspected H5N1 bird flu in ten rural communities across Russia. The confirmed outbreak sites are in the central areas of Tula and Tambov, as well as in the Urals province of Chelyabinsk and in Omsk and Altai, in Siberia.

== November ==
November 12, 2005

- Kuwait has reported positive testing of two birds, one infected with H5N1, and the other with the H5N2 virus, making them the first cases of infection in the Middle East. A flamingo holding the H5N1 virus was found dead by the sea, as Gulf News reports, it was killed by authorities and did not die from the virus.

== December ==
December 30, 2005 "China confirms its third human death from bird flu. That brings the death toll [...] to 74, comprising 14 victims in Thailand, four in Cambodia, 11 in Indonesia, 42 in Vietnam and three in China."

== See also ==
- Global spread of H5N1 in 2004
- Global spread of H5N1 in 2006
- Global spread of H5N1 in 2007
