= Global spread of H5N1 in 2004 =

The global spread of (highly pathogenic) H5N1 in birds is considered a significant pandemic threat.

While prior H5N1 strains have been known, they were significantly different from the current H5N1 strain on a genetic level, making the global spread of this new strain unprecedented. The current H5N1 strain is a fast-mutating, highly pathogenic avian influenza virus (HPAI) found in multiple bird species. It is both epizootic (an epidemic in non-humans) and panzootic (a disease affecting animals of many species especially over a wide area). Unless otherwise indicated, "H5N1" in this article refers to the recent highly pathogenic strain of H5N1.

H5N1 caused flu outbreaks in 1959 and in 1991 but these strains were very different from the current highly pathogenic strain of H5N1. Evolution from 1999 to 2002 created the Z genotype which became the dominant strain of highly pathogenic H5N1 in 2004.

In January 2004 a major new outbreak of H5N1 surfaced in Vietnam and Thailand's poultry industry, and within weeks spread to ten countries and regions in Asia, including Indonesia, South Korea, Japan and China. In October 2004 researchers discovered H5N1 is far more dangerous than previously believed because waterfowl were directly spreading the highly pathogenic strain of H5N1 to chickens, crows, pigeons, and other birds and that it was increasing its ability to infect mammals as well. From this point on, avian influenza experts increasingly refer to containment as a strategy that can delay but not prevent a future avian flu pandemic.

== January ==
Cumulative Human Cases of and Deaths from H5N1 As of April 11, 2007
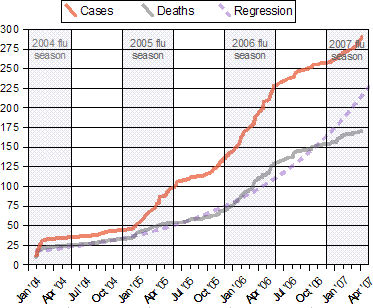
- Notes: Source WHO Confirmed Human Cases of H5N1; "[T]he incidence of human cases peaked, in each of the three years in which cases have occurred, during the period roughly corresponding to winter and spring in the northern hemisphere. If this pattern continues, an upsurge in cases could be anticipated starting in late 2006 or early 2007." Avian influenza – epidemiology of human H5N1 cases reported to WHO; The regression curve for deaths is y = a + e^{k x}, and is shown extended through the end of April, 2007.

- A major new outbreak of H5N1 surfaced in Vietnam and Thailand's poultry industry, and within weeks spread to ten countries and regions in Asia, including Indonesia, South Korea, Japan and China. Intensive efforts were undertaken to slaughter chickens, ducks and geese (over forty million chickens alone were slaughtered in high-infection areas), and the outbreak was contained by March, but the total human death toll in Vietnam and Thailand was twenty three people.

== February ==
- "The Ministry of Public Health in Thailand has confirmed the country's tenth case of H5N1 infection."

== July ==
- Fresh outbreaks in poultry were confirmed in Ayutthaya and Pathumthani provinces of Thailand, and Chaohu city in Anhui, China. Research identifies the dominant strain of H5N1 as the "Z genotype".

== August ==
- Avian flu was confirmed in Kampung Pasir, Kelantan, Malaysia. Two chickens were confirmed to be carrying H5N1. As a result, Singapore has imposed a ban on the importation of chickens and poultry products. Similarly the EU has imposed a ban on Malaysian poultry products. A cull of all poultry has been ordered by the Malaysian government within a 10 km radius of the location of this outbreak. These moves appear to have been successful and since then, Singapore has lifted the ban and Malaysia has requested the OIE declare Malaysian poultry bird flu free.

== September ==
- More cases of H5N1 in humans in Thailand.

== October ==
- Researchers discover H5N1 is far more dangerous than previously believed. "In the past, outbreaks of highly pathogenic avian influenza in poultry began following the primary introduction of a virus, of low pathogenicity, probably carried by a wild bird. The virus then required several months of circulation in domestic poultry in order to mutate from a form causing very mild disease to a form causing highly pathogenic disease, with a mortality approaching 100%. Only viruses of the H5 and H7 subtypes are capable of mutating to cause highly pathogenic disease. In the present outbreaks, however, asymptomatic domestic ducks can directly introduce the virus, in its highly pathogenic form, to poultry flocks." Limiting this conclusion to domestic waterfowl proved to be wishful thinking, as in later months it became clear that nondomestic waterfowl were also directly spreading the highly pathogenic strain of H5N1 to chickens, crows, pigeons, and other birds and that it was increasing its ability to infect mammals as well. From this point on, avian influenza experts increasingly refer to containment as a strategy that can delay but not prevent a future avian flu pandemic.

== November ==
- The U.S.'s National Institutes of Health's (NIH) National Institute of Allergy and Infectious Diseases's (NIAID) Influenza Genome Sequencing Project to provide complete sequence data for selected human and avian influenza isolates begins.

== December ==
- "[F]irst human case of H5N1 [is] detected in Vietnam since early September".

== See also ==
- Global spread of H5N1 in 2005
- Global spread of H5N1 in 2006
- Global spread of H5N1 in 2007
