= 2006 dengue outbreak in Pakistan =

Disease outbreak in Pakistan

The 2006 dengue outbreak in Pakistan was at the time the worst on record in terms of mortality. There were 1,931 lab-confirmed cases, and 41 confirmed deaths, according to the World Health Organization Regional Office for the Eastern Mediterranean. Other sources report a death toll of 52. Most of the cases were from the east, center and north of Karachi, the capital city of Sindh.

At the time, dengue was a relatively new public-health challenge in Pakistan. Limited patient-management standards contributed to a higher mortality rate. The principal mosquito vectors - Aedes aegypti and Aedes albopictus - were already recognized, and subsequent studies identified their increasing role in dengue transmission.

== See also ==
- 2006 dengue outbreak in India
- 2011 dengue outbreak in Pakistan
- Mosquito control
