= 1998 Winter Olympics flu epidemic =

1998 flu outbreak in Japan

The 1998 Winter Olympics flu epidemic was a flu outbreak in Japan which coincided with the 1998 Winter Olympics in Nagano. Several athletes blamed poor or disappointing results on this flu.

== The Outbreak ==
During the winters of 1998 and 1999, there was an outbreak in Japan that appeared to be associated with influenza. Upon further research, the outbreak was discovered to be caused by Type A Influenza and the Japanese Encephalitis Virus. Nearly 900,000 people became ill and at least 20 people, including 17 schoolchildren and three elderly people, died due to the flu virus.

== During the Olympics ==
The on February 9, 1998, the International Olympic Committee (IOC) warned competitors competing in the Winter Olympics abouts a strain of flu hitting the Japanese Alps region. The flu outbreak spread across Japan, with many schools across the country being closed. Then-Prime Minister Ryutaro Hashimoto's wife, Kumiko, was hospitalized with the virus. Many athletes were forced to either withdraw or give a subpar performance because of the flu, including Russian figure skater Alexei Yagudin, Canadian figure skaters Elvis Stojko (who blamed his silver medal win on "groin pain and a brutal flu") and Marie-Claude Savard-Gagnon.
