= 2006 dengue outbreak in India =

Disease outbreak in India

In the 2006 dengue outbreak in India, cases of dengue fever were reported first from New Delhi in early September and by the end of September other states also started to report deaths. At least 3613 confirmed cases of dengue fever were reported and over 50 people died in the outbreak.

== Outbreak ==
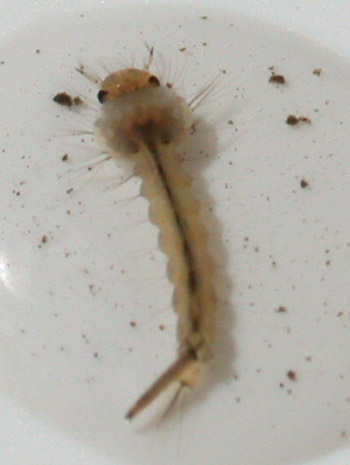
A mosquito larva

- New Delhi: By early October, more than 590 cases of dengue fever were reported from Delhi and over 367 from neighbouring states who had come to New Delhi for treatment.
- Rajasthan: By 12 September, more than 35 patients were treated for dengue fever.
- Chandigarh: 159 cases of dengue fever were reported. These were reported from the Post-graduate Institute of Medical Education and Research, the government run multi-specialty hospital. However out of 159 only 29 were from Chandigarh and the remaining were from Punjab, Haryana and Uttar Pradesh who had come to Chandigarh for treatment.
- Uttar Pradesh: Over 214 suspected cases of the diseases were reported.
- Andhra Pradesh: One person succumbed to the disease and at least five were treated.
- West Bengal: Over 30 people were treated for dengue fever in Kolkata.

By 9 October 2006, more than fifty deaths were reported to dengue fever and more than 3613 patients were treated for this disease.

== Statistical data ==
The Government of India's Health Department released the statistical data related to dengue fever in a press statement on 8 October 2006.

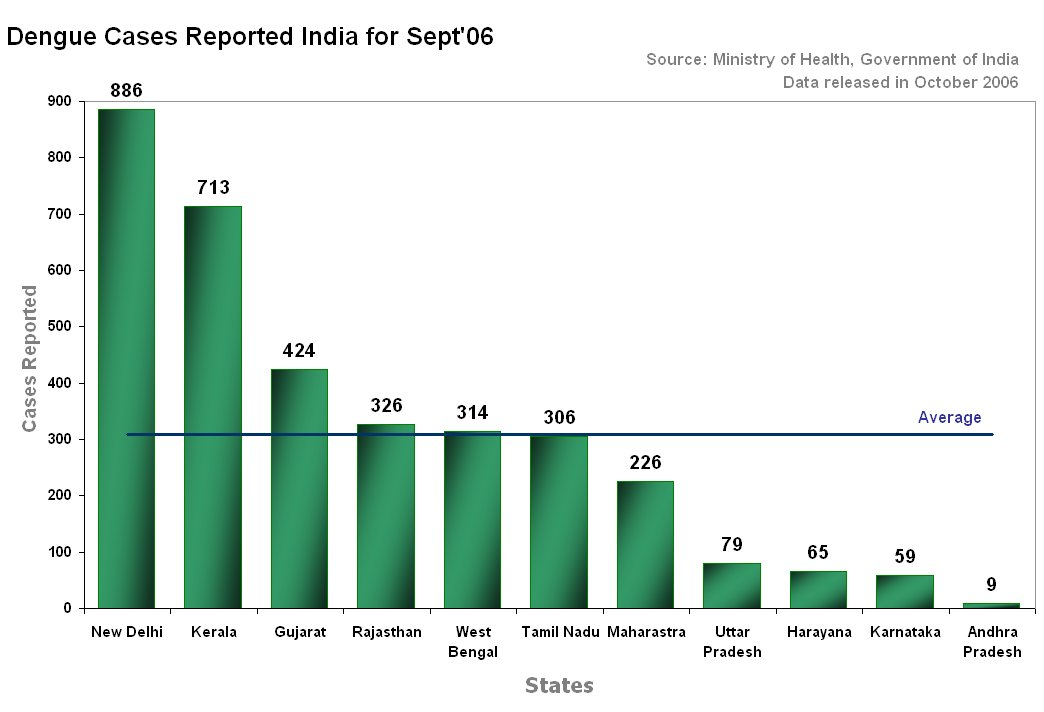
A chart showing the number of dengue cases reported in various states

Nationwide data on the dengue outbreak, released by the Ministry of Health

State	Cases reported
New Delhi	886
Kerala	713
Gujarat	424
Rajasthan	326
West Bengal	314
Tamil Nadu	306
Maharashtra	226
Uttar Pradesh	79
Haryana	65
Karnataka	59
Andhra Pradesh	9

On 13 October 2006, six persons died due to dengue fever in Delhi. It was the highest number of deaths reported from Delhi in a day due to this disease.

== High profile dengue cases ==
- The magnitude of the issue was highlighted when a practising doctor and a student, Tom Anthony Richardson Wright studying at the All India Institute of Medical Sciences died due to dengue fever. As of 30 September 2006 at least 12 medics and 5 employees of AIIMS tested positive with dengue fever.
- Two grandsons (Rohan and Madhav) and son-in-law (Vijay Tankha) of Prime Minister Manmohan Singh were admitted to the private ward of AIIMS for suspected dengue fever.

== Prevention ==
- To prevent the outbreak, the Ministry of Health set up a control room at the Directorate of National Vector Borne Disease Control Programme in New Delhi to monitor the situation and to provide technical guidance and logistic support to the affected states and union territories.
- To prevent the situation from worsening, heath workers in New Delhi sprayed pesticides to eradicate the menace.

== See also ==
- 2006 dengue outbreak in Pakistan
- Dengue fever
