= Global spread of H5N1 in 2006 =

2006 worldwide disease outbreak

Cumulative Human Cases of and Deaths from H5N1 As of April 11, 2007
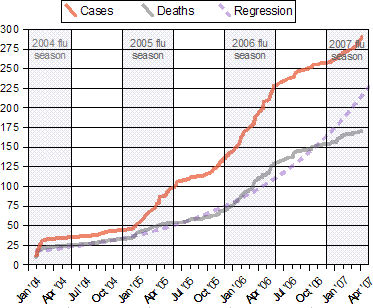
- Notes: Source WHO Confirmed Human Cases of H5N1; "[T]he incidence of human cases peaked, in each of the three years in which cases have occurred, during the period roughly corresponding to winter and spring in the northern hemisphere. If this pattern continues, an upsurge in cases could be anticipated starting in late 2006 or early 2007." Avian influenza – epidemiology of human H5N1 cases reported to WHO; The regression curve for deaths is y = a + e^{k x}, and is shown extended through the end of April, 2007.

The global spread of (highly pathogenic) H5N1 in birds is considered a significant pandemic threat.

While prior H5N1 strains have been known, they were significantly different from the 2006 strain of H5N1 on a genetic level, making the global spread of this new strain unprecedented. The 2006 strain of H5N1 is a fast-mutating, highly pathogenic avian influenza virus (HPAI) found in multiple bird species. It is both epizootic (an epidemic in non-humans) and panzootic (a disease affecting animals of many species especially over a wide area). Unless otherwise indicated, "H5N1" in this article refers to the highly pathogenic 2006 strain of H5N1.

In the first two months of 2006 H5N1 spread to Africa and Europe in wild bird populations possibly signaling the beginning of H5N1 being endemic in wild migratory bird populations on multiple continents for decades, permanently changing the way poultry are farmed. In addition, the spread of highly pathogenic H5N1 to wild birds, birds in zoos and even sometimes to mammals (example: pet cats) raises many unanswered questions concerning best practices for threat mitigation, trying to balance reducing risks of human and nonhuman deaths from the current nonpandemic strain with reducing possible pandemic deaths by limiting its chances of mutating into a pandemic strain.

By April 2006, scientists had concluded that containment had failed due to the role of wild birds in transmitting the virus and were now emphasizing far more comprehensive risk mitigation and management measures.

In June 2006 the World Health Organization predicted an upsurge in human deaths due to H5N1 during late 2006 or early 2007. In July and August 2006, significantly increased numbers of bird deaths due to H5N1 were recorded in Cambodia, China, Laos, Nigeria, and Thailand while continuing unabated a rate unparalleled in Indonesia. In September, Egypt and Sudan joined the list of nations seeing a resurgence of bird deaths due to H5N1; followed by Vietnam and South Korea in December.

In 2006, the World Organisation for Animal Health started requiring reporting H5 and H7 avian influenza fearing pathogenic mutants. The USDA started tracking wild birds, backyard flocks, commercial flocks and live bird markets.

== January ==
January 5, 2006

- A second Turkish child from the same family died from bird flu. Her brother had already died of the H5N1 strain of bird flu.

January 7, 2006

- Two more children in Turkey are hospitalized after contracting bird flu like symptoms then later test positive for H5N1. They are both from the same area as the prior three children that died from H5N1 bringing the total number of cases in Turkey to 5, with 2 of them fatal. 76 people have died since the outbreak began in 2003.

January 8, 2006

- Three people are hospitalized after developing suspected H5N1 in the Turkish capital.

January 10, 2006

- A woman is diagnosed with bird flu, as Turkey struggles to contain the outbreak.
- China announces that two more people had died of bird flu before 2006 began.
- Indonesia confirms that a 29-year-old woman has died from suspected bird flu.
- Birds begin dying in Nigeria. It is not known until February that it is an H5N1 outbreak.

January 16, 2006

- A 15-year-old Indonesian girl from Indramayu, West Java, dies of bird flu.

January 18, 2006

- China and Turkey each confirm another human death from H5N1.
- A 13-year-old boy dies in Indonesia, he is the brother of the girl who died on January 16.
- Donor nations pledge US$1.85 billion to combat bird flu at the two-day International Pledging Conference on Avian and Human Influenza held in China.

January 21, 2006

- The WHO confirms that the two Indonesian children died of H5N1.

January 29, 2006

- H5N1 is found in dead birds in northern Cyprus. The European Commission freezes transfers of animals and animal products from the north of the island through the green line to the areas controlled by the Republic of Cyprus and to the rest of the European Union.

January 30, 2006

- According to WHO:

The Ministry of Health in Iraq has confirmed the country's first case of human infection with the H5N1 avian influenza virus. The case occurred in a 15-year-old girl who died on 17 January following a severe respiratory illness. Her symptoms were compatible with a diagnosis of H5N1 avian influenza. Preliminary laboratory confirmation was provided by a US Naval Medical Research Unit located in Cairo, Egypt. The girl's 39-year-old uncle, who cared for her during her illness, developed symptoms on 24 January and died of a severe respiratory disease on 27 January. Both patients resided in the town of Raniya near Sulaimaniyah in the northern part of the country, close to the border with Turkey. Poultry deaths were recently reported in their neighbourhood, but H5N1 avian influenza has not yet been confirmed in birds in any part of the country. Poultry samples have been sent for testing at an external laboratory. A history of exposure to diseased birds has been found for the girl. The uncle's source of infection is under investigation. The Ministry of Health has further informed WHO of a third human case of respiratory illness that is under investigation for possible H5N1 infection. The patient is a 54-year-old woman, from the same area, who was hospitalized on 18 January. Specimens are on their way to a WHO collaborating laboratory in the United Kingdom for diagnostic confirmation and further analysis. An international team, including representatives of other UN agencies, is being assembled to assist the Ministry of Health in its investigation of the situation and its planning of an appropriate public health response. WHO staff within Iraq have been directly supporting the government's operational response, which was launched shortly after the girl's death. Iraq is the seventh country to report human H5N1 infection in the current outbreak. The first human case occurred in Vietnam in December 2003.

== February ==
February 4, 2006

- Indonesia confirms three new cases, two of which were fatal.
- A dead swan near the city of Vidin, Bulgaria is found to contain the H5 strain. Further testing begins to determine if the bird died from the H5N1 type of the disease. Over 20 dead birds are found along the Danube and in lakes near the Black Sea.

February 6, 2006

- Preliminary report is sent from Nigeria to OIE on a massive bird die off that began January 10. Report was sent by Dr. Junaidu A. Maina, acting director, Department of Livestock and Pest Control Services, Federal Ministry of Agriculture and Rural Development, Abuja, Nigeria.

February 7, 2006

- OIE/FAO Reference Laboratory for avian influenza and Newcastle disease in Padova, Italy, confirmed highly pathogenic avian influenza virus subtype H5N1 in Nigerian isolates from samples taken January 16.

February 8, 2006

- The Nigeria situation is announced to the world. Nigeria is the first African country to have an H5N1 outbreak confirmed. It affected a commercial chicken farm (owned by Nigeria's sports minister, Saidu Samaila Sambawa) in which ostriches and geese were also kept, in Jaji village in Igabi administrative division (local government area or LGA) in Kaduna State in Nigeria. The control measures said to be used include killing poultry, quarantining poultry, poultry movement control, and disinfection; however there are complaints that these measures are in fact not being carried out. 40,000 out of 46,000 caged chickens died of H5N1 despite being treated by their owner with broadspectrum antibiotics. The remaining 6,000 have been killed to try to control spread of the disease.

February 9, 2006

- Four new farms in Nigeria are confirmed to have H5N1 outbreaks: two in Kano State, one in Plateau State and a second farm in Kaduna State.
- Veterinarians from Onderstepoort Veterinary Institute, Faculty of Veterinary Science, University of Pretoria in South Africa offer their expertise to assist in tracking occurrence of the virus in Nigeria and elsewhere in Africa.
- The United States, OIE and WHO are sending experts, supplies and money to Nigeria to help with this H5N1 crisis.
- H5N1 flu in Africa is expected to spread and create a very severe situation.
- Farmers in northern Nigeria are rushing to sell dead chickens at cut-price rates before government bans are put into place. Promised measures to contain the disease are still not in place.
- European countries are facing an increased probability that spring bird migrations from Africa will bring H5N1.
- Countries in Africa near to Nigeria are responding with "dread" and import restrictions.

February 10, 2006

- Officials in Azerbaijan say H5N1 virus has been identified in wild birds floating dead in the Caspian Sea near Baku

February 11, 2006

- The government of Italy confirms that H5N1 has been found in wild swans in Sicily and elsewhere in the country. It is also found in wild birds in Greece and Bulgaria.

February 12, 2006

- The government of Slovenia confirms that the virus subtype H5 has been found in a wild swan by the Drava river near Maribor. The samples have been sent to the United Kingdom to determine if it is the deadly H5N1 strain.

February 13, 2006

- Nihat Kabil, Bulgaria's Minister of Agriculture and Forestry, confirms a second case of a swan with the H5 virus. While the first case was in Vidin (in the country's northwest), the second one was near Krajmorie, a Black Sea port in the Burgas region (in the country's southeast), about 3.5 km (2.2 mi) from an egg farm. Several other cases have been reported in other parts of the country, and Mr. Kabil has said that there is a high probability that Bulgaria will have its first mass case within days.

February 14, 2006

- Health authorities report the first case of the H5N1 virus in Austria. Two dead swans at Mellach near Graz were found to be carrying the virus.
- Following the discovery of four dead swans suspected of carrying the H5N1 virus on the island of Rügen in North-east Germany, authorities in Germany and several other EU countries make it compulsory for all poultry to be kept inside enclosures effective as of February 20.

February 15, 2006

- Slovenian Ministry of Agriculture, Forestry and Food declares entire Slovenia a bird-flu high risk zone after tests confirmed the dead swan (found on 9 February) was carrying H5. It is sent to Great Britain for further subtype determination.
- Avian influenza H5N1 is identified in some dead swans in Hungary. Not known until the end of February whether they carried the human-infecting strain (genotype Z) of H5N1.
- Iran reports cases in wild birds.

February 17, 2006

- The presence of H5N1 in Slovenia is confirmed.
- Egypt has detected its first cases in several parts of the country, the government detailed three separate sites where birds were found carrying the virus.
- France has recorded a case of a duck infected with the H5 virus in Ain, near Lyon. It was later confirmed that the duck was infected with the H5N1 strain of the virus. A swan earlier tested negative for the disease.
- Iraq confirms a second person has died of H5N1 - he was the uncle of the country's initial death.

February 18, 2006

- Officials in India's western Maharashtra state are planning a poultry cull after the country reported its first cases of the deadly H5N1 strain of bird flu.

February 19, 2006

- First suspected bird flu human death reported from Surat, Gujarat, India.

February 20, 2006

- Croatia has recorded a new case of a swan infected with the H5 virus in Ciovu, near Trogir. At the same time, H5 is confirmed in two dead swans found at a lake near Jajce, Bosnia and Herzegovina.
- A United Kingdom laboratory confirms the three cases of H5N1 in dead swans found near the cities of Dobrich, Varna and Burgas, in Bulgaria's northeastern and southeastern regions. The previous H5N1 case was recorded near Vidin in the northwest.

February 21, 2006

- The Malaysian government confirms 40 chickens died of H5N1 in Selangor.
- Professor Neil Ferguson, Imperial College London biologist, says:

"This is a disease which doesn't go away so we are going to be living with H5N1 in Western Europe, I believe, in wild bird populations - even endemic in wild bird populations - for decades perhaps, or even sporadically in those populations every year."

- The scientific journal Nature says:

"The virus is highly likely to become endemic, says Peter Openshaw, head of the respiratory viral infections section at the National Heart and Lung Institute in London, UK. We have to change the way poultry are farmed. [...] Jan Slingenbergh, an animal health expert at the United Nations' Food and Agriculture Organization (FAO) in Rome, Italy, points out that H5N1 may survive in icy lake waters over European winters, potentially infecting any migratory birds that subsequently arrive. The virus could also become established in permanently resident European birds; Openshaw notes that H5N1 has so far been able to infect a wide range of species. If this happens, farming practices will have to be changed, says Neil Ferguson, an epidemiologist at Imperial College London, UK, who is advising the British government on how to deal with possible future outbreaks."

- Slovakia becomes the latest EU nation to confirm cases of the virulent H5N1 bird flu strain. One of the dead birds was a smew duck found in the capital, Bratislava, the other a hawk in Gabcikovo, southwestern Slovakia

February 25, 2006

- France For the first time an EU farm becomes infected and 80% of the more than 11 thousand birds die for the H5N1 flu in the previous week

February 27, 2006

- Niger confirms a case of H5N1 bird flu in a flock of ducks near the border with Nigeria
- Switzerland says a dead swan has been found on Lake Geneva which the H5 virus.
- Bosnia's veterinary office said that tests at the European Union reference laboratory confirmed its first case of the deadly H5N1 bird flu virus in two wild swans near Jajce. Thousands of birds were culled.

February 28, 2006

- Confirmed case of highly pathogenic H5 in Sweden
- Finland: The 20 dead ducks and 1 crow at Kotka, Sapokka park, were confirmed not to be carriers of H5N1. The reason for the deaths remains to be solved. On March 13 an insecticide, parathion was confirmed to be the reason for deaths. The toxin is life-threatening to humans. The use of parathion has been banned in Finland since 1992.

== March ==
March 1, 2006

- Scientists confirm the dead swan found on Lake Geneva on February 27 had H5N1. It is the first confirmed case of H5N1 in Switzerland.
- A second case of H5 bird flu has been found in Switzerland, this time on Lake Constance, near the town of Egnach, Thurgau.
- Greece confirms three new cases of H5N1 in swans found the northern part of the country, bringing the total number of cases in the country to 19.
- 8 Quebec farms are quarantined after receiving live poultry from France. The province braces itself for its first H5N1 cases.

March 2, 2006

- A chicken from a farm, 175 km south from Addis Ababa, is being tested for the possibility of having H5N1 in Ethiopia, the first possible case in East Africa.
- Serbia detected the bird flu in a dead swan that was found in northwest Serbia in Bački Monoštor (near Croatia)
- Tests on live ducks imported France to Quebec have come back negative for H5N1.

March 3, 2006

- Sweden confirms eight new cases of H5 bird flu virus
- Azerbaijan confirms first case of H5N1 bird flu in poultry

March 4, 2006

- H5N1 was found in a wild goose in Lower Saxony, Germany, making it the sixth federal state in the country to report a case of the disease.
- Austria's cases of H5N1 rise to 29 with three ducks, a seagull, and a grebe found with the disease in Vorarlberg.

March 5, 2006

- Poland has reported its first case of H5N1 in a wild swan found dead two days ago in Toruń, a city in northern Poland.
- A man in the southern Chinese province of Guangdong has died of H5N1. This is the eighth death in the country caused by avian flu.
- A new case of H5N1 was reported in Buzău, Romania in a wild goose found dead a week ago.

March 6, 2006

- Poland confirms H5N1 in two swans.

March 8, 2006

- Albania has reported its first case of H5N1, found in a domestic chicken in the village of Cukes, near Sarandë, in the south of the country.
- Myanmar found H5N1 in chickens after an HPAI outbreak on March 8.

March 9, 2006

- Serbia (and by extension, Serbia and Montenegro) has confirmed that a wild swan found dead near Sombor carried the deadly H5N1 bird flu, the first confirmed case in the country.

March 10, 2006

- Poland has confirmed that a wild swan found dead near Lublin carried the H5 bird flu, it was the second confirmed case in the country.

March 12, 2006

- Cameroon reports its first outbreak of the H5N1 in a duck farm in Maroua, in the Far North Province.

March 14, 2006

- Azerbaijan reports three deaths from the H5N1 virus.

March 15, 2006

- Sweden has confirmed its first case of H5N1 in two wild ducks found near the Baltic Sea port city of Oskarshamn.
- Culling begins in Jalgaon, Maharastra, India.
- Denmark has confirmed its first case of H5N1 in one common buzzard found dead at a beach near the city of Næstved.

March 16, 2006

- Afghanistan finds deadly H5N1 virus.

March 17, 2006

- H5N1 bird-flu strain had been found in tens of thousands of poultry in Israel.

March 18, 2006

- Egypt has confirmed the first human death caused by H5N1 virus.

March 19, 2006

- Egypt has reported its second human case of bird flu, a 30-year-old man who worked on a chicken farm in the province of Qalyoubiya.

March 20, 2006

- Kazakhstan has reported another outbreak of H5N1 in the western part of the country, found in a wild swan.
- Another outbreak of H5N1 in Malaysia resulted in the death of six chickens in the province of Seberang Perai, in the state of Penang.

March 21, 2006

- Pakistan confirms its first cases of H5N1 at chickens in two farms in the Khyber Pakhtunkhwa province.

March 24, 2006

- A dead wild buzzard is found to be the first case of H5N1 in Berlin, Germany.
- H5N1 confirmed in the Gaza Strip, the West Bank and Jordan.

March 26, 2006

- A peregrine falcon in the Tin Shui Wai, which is in Yuen Long of Hong Kong has been confirmed to have died as a result of H5N1 infection.

March 29, 2006

- The Czech Republic confirms its first case of H5N1 in a swan on the Vltava River, near Hluboká nad Vltavou.
- The EU reference laboratory in Weybridge, Great Britain confirms the first case of H5N1 found in Denmark a few weeks before.

March 30, 2006

- A dead swan confirmed to have H5N1 is found in the city of Grudziądz in northern Poland.

March 31, 2006

- First human case of the bird flu was announced in Jordan.

== April ==
April 3, 2006

- The World Health Organization confirmed four cases of bird flu in Egypt over the past month, including two fatalities, the first reports of human deaths due to H5N1 in Africa.

April 4, 2006

- Burkina Faso has detected H5N1 in poultry on the outskirts of the capital, Ouagadougou, making the West African country the fifth nation on the continent to report the disease. Nigeria, Niger, Cameroon and Egypt have already confirmed the virus in Africa.

April 5, 2006

- H5N1 is detected in domestic poultry near Leipzig, Germany.

April 6, 2006

- H5N1 is detected in a wild migratory swan (whooper swan, Cygnus cygnus) in Cellardyke in Fife, Scotland.
- British authorities declare a 1,000-mile (1,600 km) wild bird risk area around Cellardyke.

April 10, 2006

- Over one hundred outbreaks have been reported in Myanmar since March 13, the first time since 2004 that H5N1 has been detected in the country.
- A wild swan found in the Sava River, near the Croatian capital of Zagreb, is confirmed to have H5N1.

April 11, 2006

- "The Scientific Seminar on Avian Influenza, the Environment and Migratory Birds met from 10–11 April 2006 at UN Office in Nairobi, Kenya. The Seminar was organized by the United Nations Environment Programme (UNEP) Division of Early Warning and Assessment (DEWA) in cooperation with the Convention on Migratory Species of Wild Animals (CMS) and its Agreement on the Conservation of African-Eurasian Migratory Waterbirds (AEWA). [...] Hepworth identified the Seminar's objectives to: stimulate debate on the role of wild birds in transmitting the virus; provide up-to-date status reports and advice for decision-makers; increase awareness of the recent Multilateral Environmental Agreement (MEA) resolutions among all governments; promote further research on virus behavior and transmission; and encourage international technical cooperation and risk mitigation." The seminar concluded with reaffirmations to disseminate the Seminar's findings and to manage the risks associated with HPAI.

April 12, 2006

- The Panel on Animal Health and Welfare (AHAW) of the European Food Safety Authority (EFSA) publishes a scientific statement on the role of migratory birds in the spread of the H5N1 form of avian influenza (AI) amongst domestic and wild bird populations in the European Union (EU). The statement was supplemented by a formal opinion released on May 12, 2006.

April 18, 2006

- Sudan reports its first case of H5N1 at a poultry farm in Khartoum, as well as the state of Al Jazirah.

== May ==
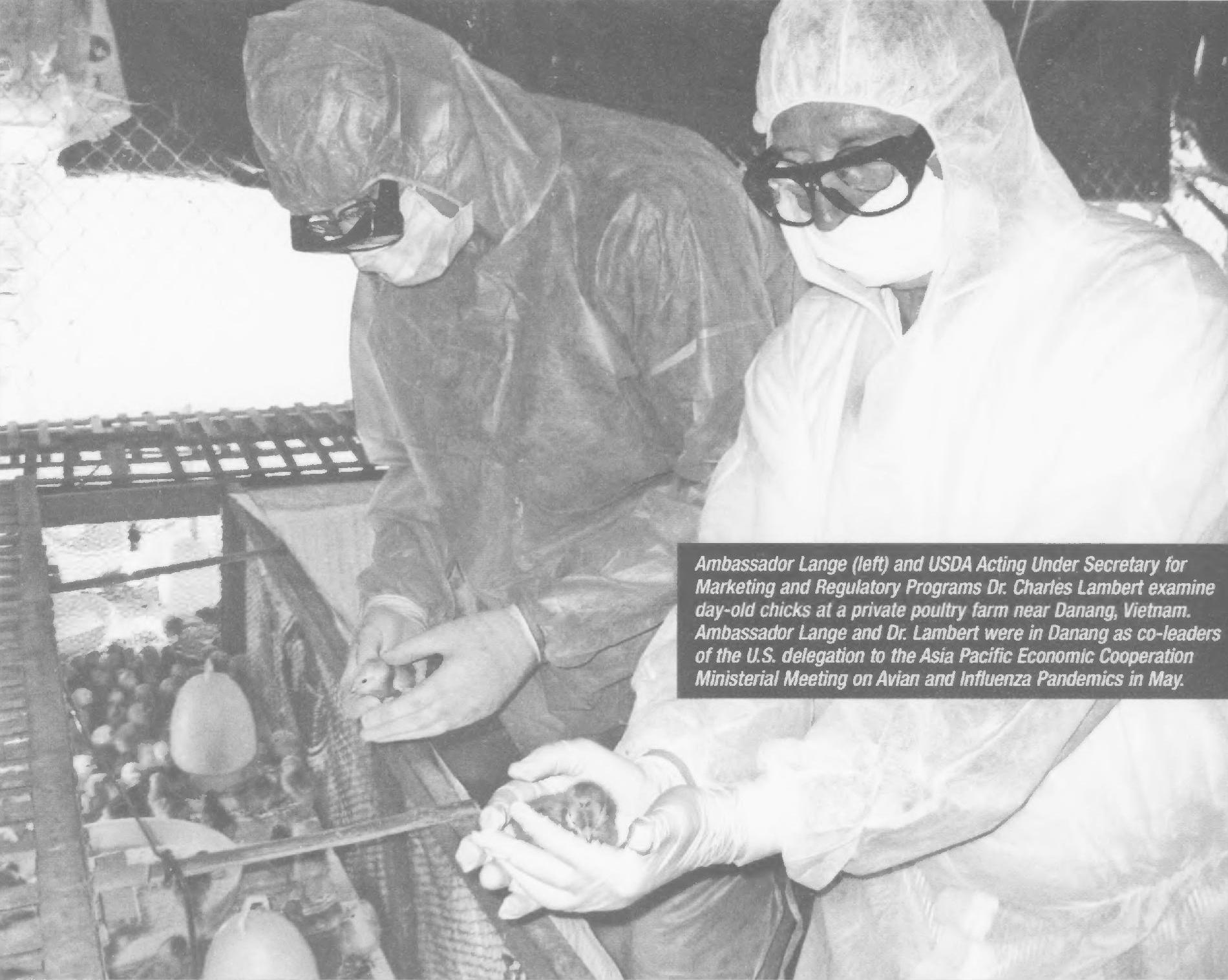
U.S. Special Representative on Avian and Pandemic Influenza John E. Lange examining chicks at a poultry farm in Da Nang, Vietnam

May 5, 2006

- "Ivory Coast prepared to slaughter chickens and tightened restrictions on movements of poultry on Thursday after reporting outbreaks of bird flu in two heavily populated neighbourhoods of its main city Abidjan. The World Organisation for Animal Health (OIE) said late on Wednesday a total of 17 birds infected with the deadly H5N1 strain of avian influenza had been found in separate outbreaks in the Marcory Anoumabo and Treichville suburbs of Abidjan."

May 11, 2006

- "Djibouti said on Thursday that one person had tested positive for the deadly H5N1 avian influenza virus in the first confirmed human case in the Horn of Africa."

May 13, 2006

- WHO investigated possible H5N1 human cluster in North Sumatra. According to local tests, five members of an extended family have died of bird flu in the past few days.

May 15, 2006

- According to local tests, a sixth member of an extended family have died of bird flu in the past few days in North Sumatra.

May 16, 2006

- According to UN officials, bird flu was found on the western half of the island of New Guinea.

May 21, 2006

- The H5 strain of bird flu is confirmed in the Romanian capital Bucharest.
- An eighteen-year-old shuttlecock maker from East Java has died of bird flu. It appears that he was not in direct contact with live birds.

May 24, 2006

- WHO reports cluster of seven victims connected only by each other indicating possible human to human spreading of H5N1

May 25, 2006

- 56 outbreaks of H5N1 have been found in Romania since the virus reemerged there 12 days ago. "The recent outbreaks have involved some large commercial farms and some poultry in Bucharest, the capital, triggering quarantine orders for some neighborhoods this week."

May 30, 2006

- The WHO publishes the WHO pandemic influenza draft protocol for rapid response and containment, detailing a proposed method for stopping the spread of a pandemic strain of H5N1 at the source.

== June ==
June 2, 2006

- Indonesian tests say that a girl on the outskirts of Jakarta died of bird flu. Her brother died on May 30 with similar symptoms, but died before he could receive medical treatment, and was buried before testing could be performed.

June 17, 2006

- The EU reference laboratory confirm the presence of the H5N1 viral strain in birds sent from the Kiskunmajsa region of Hungary for analysis.

June 23, 2006

- A family in Indonesia were confirmed to have had human-to-human spread of H5N1. A mutated strain was found, but it had not mutated into an easily transmissible strain.

June 30, 2006

- "This week's issue of the Weekly Epidemiological Record, published online by WHO, sets out results from the first analysis of epidemiological data on all 205 laboratory-confirmed H5N1 cases officially reported to WHO by onset date from December 2003 to 30 April 2006. Data used in the analysis were collected for surveillance purposes. Quality, reliability and format were not consistent across data from different countries. Despite this limitation, several conclusions could be reached.
1. The number of new countries reporting human cases increased from 4 to 9 after October 2005, following the geographical extension of outbreaks among avian populations.
2. Half of the cases occurred in people under the age of 20 years; 90% of cases occurred in people under the age of 40 years.
3. The overall case-fatality rate was 56%. Case fatality was high in all age groups but was highest in persons aged 10 to 39 years.
4. The case-fatality profile by age group differs from that seen in seasonal influenza, where mortality is highest in the elderly.
5. The overall case-fatality rate was highest in 2004 (73%), followed by 63% to date in 2006, and 43% in 2005.
6. Assessment of mortality rates and the time intervals between symptom onset and hospitalization and between symptom onset and death suggests that the illness pattern has not changed substantially during the three years.
7. Cases have occurred all year round. However, the incidence of human cases peaked, in each of the three years in which cases have occurred, during the period roughly corresponding to winter and spring in the Northern Hemisphere. If this pattern continues, an upsurge in cases could be anticipated starting in late 2006 or early 2007."

== July ==
July 5, 2006

- "Nigeria has been infected multiple times with H5N1 bird flu probably carried by migratory birds from southern Russia and northern Europe or introduced by imported chickens, scientists said on Wednesday. After analysing samples from infected birds on two farms in south-western Nigeria they found the viruses were genetically distinct from each other and from H5N1 found in the north of the country. So rather than one strain spreading through the country, different strains had been introduced on separate occasions, which could make controlling the spread of the virus more difficult. [...] The analysed samples were similar to strains found in southern Russia and northern Europe but not from southeast Asia"

July 7, 2006

- "A Spanish laboratory has confirmed the country's first case of H5N1 bird flu after analyzing a sample taken from a wild migratory water bird" (the great crested grebe). Analysis shows that the bird is unlikely to be from Africa.

July 22, 2006

- "China's official Xinhua news agency says a new bird flu outbreak has killed more than 3,000 chickens in the northwest. The Ministry of Agriculture told Xinhua that the July 14 outbreak in Xinjiang region's Aksu city is under control. No human infections have been reported. Saturday's report says the deadly H5N1 virus killed 3,045 chickens, and nearly 357,000 more were destroyed in an emergency response. Xinhua says the local agriculture department has quarantined the infected area. The government's last reported outbreak was in the northwestern region of Ningxia earlier this month."

July 26, 2006

- The World Health Organization (WHO) confirmed on July 26, 2006, that a 17-year-old boy who died on July 24, 2006, in the Phichit province of northern Thailand had H5N1 avian influenza, marking the country's first case this year. H5N1 was recently detected in 31 dead chickens in Phichit province. Thai health officials have placed several other people from Phichit province under quarantine. "The country's agriculture minister recently announced bans on poultry imports and the transport of birds [and] the Phichit Provincial Livestock Office declared the Bang Mulnarg district an avian flu-infected area, which allows officials to conduct full-scale disease control efforts, including culling, quarantine, screening, and disinfection of affected sites."

July 28, 2006

- Due to H5N1, about 2,500 chickens died on the Dongbang poultry farm in Xaythany district, Laos beginning July 18, 2006. This is the country's first major outbreak since 2004. "The government of Laos has taken immediate action to control the spread of the virus by culling all chickens in the farm, disinfecting the farm and imposed movement restrictions within the five kilometre surveillance zone", said Wantanee Kalpravidh, FAO regional coordinator for Avian Influenza Projects.

== August ==
August 5, 2006

- A German zoo and a Vietnam theme park both report highly pathogenic H5N1 in their birds.

August 12, 2006

- "Cambodia has suffered its second outbreak of bird flu this year in the same province where the H5N1 virus killed a boy in April, officials said on Saturday. The virus was confirmed in more than 1,300 ducks that died in Prey Veng province, 70 km (43 mi) southeast of Phnom Penh, but there were no immediate reports of human infections, they said. Yes, bird flu is back, senior Agriculture Ministry official Nou Muth said."

August 18, 2006

- On August 18, 2006, the World Health Organization (WHO) changed the H5N1 avian influenza strains recommended for candidate vaccines for the first time since 2004. "Many experts who follow the ongoing analysis of the H5N1 virus sequences are alarmed at how fast the virus is evolving into an increasingly more complex network of clades and subclades, Osterholm said. The evolving nature of the virus complicates vaccine planning. He said if an avian influenza pandemic emerges, a strain-specific vaccine will need to be developed to treat the disease. Recognition of the three new subclades means researchers face increasingly complex options about which path to take to stay ahead of the virus."

August 25, 2006

- CIDRAP reported on August 25, 2006, on a new US government Web site that allows the public to view current information about testing of wild birds for H5N1 avian influenza which is part of a national wild-bird surveillance plan that "includes five strategies for early detection of highly pathogenic avian influenza. Sample numbers from three of these will be available on HEDDS: live wild birds, subsistence hunter-killed birds, and investigations of sick and dead wild birds. The other two strategies involve domestic bird testing and environmental sampling of water and wild-bird droppings. [...] A map on the new USGS site shows that 9,327 birds from Alaska have been tested so far this year, with only a few from most other states. Last year officials tested just 721 birds from Alaska and none from most other states, another map shows. The goal of the surveillance program for 2006 is to collect 75,000 to 100,000 samples from wild birds and 50,000 environmental samples, officials have said."

== September ==
September 7, 2006

- Indonesian officials reported on September 7, 2006, that a 14-year-old Indonesian girl who died in June was infected with bird flu. The case was discovered during routine surveillance of blood samples from people who had exhibited flu symptoms. In a change of policy, Health Minister Siti Fadillah Supari reported that "we did not send (the samples) to the WHO (World Health Organization) because our positive results are usually positive results at the WHO." IOL reports that "until now, Indonesia has always sent blood and tissue samples from suspected human bird flu cases to a WHO laboratory in Hong Kong for confirmation", but that "under a new arrangement Jakarta could confirm infections after two local tests showed the person to have contracted H5N1."

September 13, 2006

- Sudan authorities announced that all the samples taken from chickens in southern Sudan in August and sent to the United Kingdom for further tests had proven positive for the deadly H5N1 bird flu virus.

September 25, 2006

- A 21-year-old female from East Java Province in Indonesia was hospitalized for symptoms of H5N1 bird flu. She is the sister of an 11-year-old male H5N1 victim who died on September 18. The source of her infection is under investigation. It is believed that she and her brother were both exposed to dead poultry in the household.

September 27, 2006

- WHO confirmed a resurgence of highly pathogenic H5N1 killing domestic chickens near Aswan, in Upper Egypt. "Animals within a one-kilometre radius of the site of infection have been culled and removed for sterile burial."

== October ==
October 4, 2006

- Bird flu no threat so far US government inspectors have stepped up their vigilance against Avian flu after recent scares in Pennsylvania and Maryland. The United States Department of Agriculture and United States Department of the Interior confirmed the presence of H5N1 avian influenza subtypes in samples from wild mallard ducks in Pennsylvania, but say testing has ruled out the possibility of this being the highly pathogenic H5N1 strain that has spread through birds in Asia, Europe and Africa. Test results indicate this low pathogenic avian influenza poses no threat to humans. The agencies say the ducks were sampled in Crawford County, Pennsylvania, in August 2006.

October 11, 2006

- An Egyptian woman who was hospitalized on October 4 is confirmed by Egyptian authorities Egypt's first human case of highly pathogenic H5N1 bird flu virus since May, according to WHO advisor Hassan el-Bushra.

October 16, 2006

- 67-year-old Indonesian woman died of bird flu after being treated at a hospital for more than a week, marking the country's 54th death from the virus, an official at the health ministry said.

October 31, 2006

- A 39-year-old Egyptian woman died of bird flu a month after symptoms first appeared. This was the first case in Egypt since May, 2006.

== November ==
November 2, 2006

- In Thailand, a dog succumbs to bird flu, raising the possibility that pets can contract the disease and potentially spread it to their human owners.

November 13, 2006

- In Indonesia two more cases of H5N1 have been confirmed by the Ministry of Health. One is a 35-year-old female, who developed symptoms on November 7. The second is a 30-month-old male, who developed symptoms on November 5.

== December ==
December 12, 2006

- South Korea announced its third major outbreak of deadly H5N1 in less than three weeks (all three in North Cholla province, 170 km (110 mi) south of Seoul). Over a million birds are being killed to try to contain it. In 2003 - 2004 the country destroyed 5.3 million birds to contain H5N1.

December 18, 2006

- The United States summarized progress the U.S. government has made preparing against an influenza pandemic:
  - Federal Pandemic Preparedness Plans: All Federal Departments and Agencies are developing their own pandemic preparedness plans to ensure that they are addressing all elements of a comprehensive checklist. The "meta-checklist" guiding their efforts is available for any institution to use, at www.pandemicflu.gov.
  - Statewide Pandemic Planning Summits: Secretary Leavitt and other senior officials from the Department of Health and Human Services have led Statewide pandemic planning summits in all States. We are investing $600 million in State and local preparedness efforts, including the exercising of pandemic plans across communities and at all levels of government.
  - Community-Wide Mitigation Strategies: We have focused unprecedented attention on the role of community-wide mitigation strategies, such as early school closure, cancellation of public gatherings, and other "social distancing" behaviors in reducing illness during a pandemic. Interim guidance on the ways communities can use these interventions most effectively will be released in January.
  - Vaccine Production: We have invested over $1 billion in the development of new cell-culture technologies for influenza vaccine production, and will soon announce contracts to adapt existing egg-based vaccine facilities for pandemic vaccine production.
  - Adjuvants: Very promising results on the testing of "dose-stretching" materials, also known as "adjuvants", have recently been announced by companies involved in this research. If proved to be safe and effective, adjuvants could allow a dramatic reduction in the amount of vaccine necessary to immunize a person against a pandemic virus, thereby allowing us to vaccinate many more people with our vaccine stockpile.
  - Rapid Diagnostic Tests: We have invested in the development of rapid diagnostic tests, to allow swift recognition of a pandemic virus in the human population, thereby allowing rapid isolation and treatment of infected individuals.
  - Bird Surveillance System: We have put a nationwide wild bird surveillance system in place to provide early warning of an outbreak of H5N1 in the bird population, and are reporting the results of these efforts to the public on an ongoing basis.
  - International Efforts: We have invested $434 million in international efforts, far more than any other nation, in an effort to build infrastructure in affected regions of the world to rapidly recognize and respond to an outbreak of a pandemic virus. In addition to improving these nations' ability to control outbreaks of H5N1 in their bird populations, these systems may make it possible to slow, stop, or limit the spread of a pandemic virus to the U.S.

December 19, 2006

- Vietnam had its first major outbreak of deadly H5N1 in thirteen months on December 6, 2006, due to chickens not being vaccinated because they had been hatched illegally. "There is a real threat now of the disease spreading to other places since the farmers threw away the birds' carcasses before the outbreak came to light."

December 24, 2006

- In Egypt a woman died of H5N1, hours after tests confirmed she and two other members of her extended family had been suffering from the highly pathogenic virus. The 30-year-old woman had been in the hospital since December 17, 2006, but doctors had not immediately suspected bird flu as she denied having had contact with poultry. The woman was part of an extended family of 33 living in a single house in a village near the town of Zifta in Gharbiya province, about 80 km north of Cairo, and was the third family member diagnosed with bird flu in 24 hours. Earlier, the World Health Organization confirmed two siblings from the same house, a brother, 26, and sister, 15, had the virus. The family raised ducks in their home, and the brother and sister had slaughtered the flock after a number of ducks had become sick and died.

== See also ==
- Global spread of H5N1 in 2004
- Global spread of H5N1 in 2005
- Fujian flu
