= Global spread of H5N1 in 2007 =

Cumulative Human Cases of and Deaths from H5N1 As of April 11, 2007
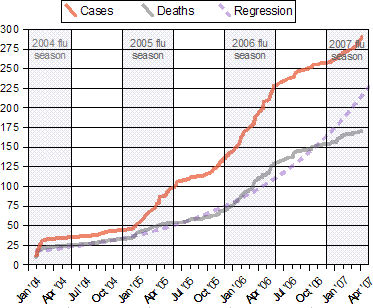
- Notes: Source WHO Confirmed Human Cases of H5N1; "[T]he incidence of human cases peaked, in each of the three years in which cases have occurred, during the period roughly corresponding to winter and spring in the northern hemisphere. If this pattern continues, an upsurge in cases could be anticipated starting in late 2006 or early 2007." Avian influenza – epidemiology of human H5N1 cases reported to WHO; The regression curve for deaths is y = a + e^{k x}, and is shown extended through the end of April, 2007.

The global spread of (highly pathogenic) H5N1 in birds is considered a significant pandemic threat.

While prior H5N1 strains have been known, they were significantly different from the current H5N1 strain on a genetic level, making the global spread of this new strain unprecedented. The current H5N1 strain is a fast-mutating, highly pathogenic avian influenza virus (HPAI) found in multiple bird species. It is both epizootic (an epidemic in non-humans) and panzootic (a disease affecting animals of many species especially over a wide area). Unless otherwise indicated, "H5N1" in this article refers to the recent highly pathogenic strain of H5N1.

In January, Japan, Hungary, Russia, and the United Kingdom joined the list of nations seeing a resurgence of bird deaths due to H5N1. In February, Pakistan, Turkey, Afghanistan, and Myanmar joined the list and Kuwait saw its first major outbreak of H5N1 avian influenza.

In March, Bangladesh and Saudi Arabia each saw their first major outbreak of H5N1 avian influenza and Ghana in May.

As H5N1 continued killing many birds and a few people throughout the spring in countries where it is now endemic, in June Malaysia and Germany saw a resurgence of bird deaths due to H5N1, while the Czech Republic and Togo experienced their first major outbreak of H5N1 avian influenza.

In July, France and India also saw a resurgence of bird deaths due to H5N1.

== January ==
- January 11, 2007: "South Korean officials say the bird flu virus had been transmitted to a human during a recent outbreak among poultry, but the person showed no symptoms of disease."
- January 11, 2007: "Bird flu reaches another province in southern Vietnam, spreading to flocks in two new areas in as many days. Some 20 unvaccinated chicks died suddenly over the weekend at a farm in Vinh Long province, and test results came back positive for the lethal H5N1 strain."
- January 12, 2007: "In Nigeria, a new outbreak of the H5N1 virus is reported in birds in Sokoto and Katsina states."
- January 14, 2007: "Japanese agricultural officials confirmed yesterday that the virulent H5N1 bird flu virus caused the deaths of thousands of chickens at a poultry farm in southern Japan this week [...] Japan's most recent [prior] outbreak occurred in Kyoto in 2004.".
- January 16, 2007: "A new outbreak of virulent bird flu is confirmed in ducks in northern Thailand -- the first such case in six months. About 100 ducks were reported dead and tested in Phitsanulok province. Wild and free-range ducks within a 3-miles radius are being culled as a precaution."
- January 17, 2007: Indonesia Works to Stem Bird Flu Cases - Indonesia plans to slaughter hundreds of thousands of backyard chickens over the next few weeks in a bid to stem a surge in human deaths from the H5N1 virus. Indonesia has recorded 61 deaths from bird flu, including four in the last week.
- January 18, 2007: "Mutations in the bird flu virus have been found in two infected people in Egypt, in a form that might be resistant to the medication most commonly used to treat the deadly disease, the WHO said. The mutations in the H5N1 virus strain were not drastic enough to make the virus infectious enough to spark a pandemic, but officials said more such mutations could prompt scientists to rethink current treatment strategies."
- January 20, 2007: "South Korea prepares to slaughter 273,000 poultry after an H5N1 outbreak at a chicken farm."
- January 25, 2007: "The European Commission has confirmed the presence of H5N1 in a farm in the southeastern Hungary."
- January 29, 2007:There was an outbreak of H5N1 at three farms or households in the Krasnodar territory, an agricultural region in the southern part of European Russia on the Black Sea, Russian officials said on January 29, 2007.

== February ==
- February 3, 2007: In early 2007 there was an outbreak of avian influenza, caused by H5N1, at one of Bernard Matthews' farms in Holton in Suffolk. This infection was confirmed on 3 February 2007. A 3 km protection zone, 10 km surveillance zone and a restricted zone encompassing 2000 km^{2} were set up and 159,000 turkeys were slaughtered with the cull being completed on 5 February. Around 320 workers at the plant were given anti-viral drugs. The plant was thoroughly disinfected. with cleaning complete on February 12 and permission being given for production to resume. Neither causation, nor a link with the Bernard Matthews plant in Hungary, has been established but the H5N1 bird flu strains found in geese in Hungary and the turkeys in Britain are 99.96% genetically identical, and almost certainly linked, according to an analysis of the viruses by the Veterinary Laboratories Agency in Weybridge, Surrey.
- February 6, 2007: H5N1 was found in a flock of 40 chickens near Islamabad, Pakistan and all the chickens are now dead from the disease bird flu or culling to prevent its spread.
- February 9, 2007: H5N1 killed 170 chickens in Bogazkoy village, in southeastern Turkey. Nearly 1,000 birds have been culled in Bogazkoy and two nearby villages."
- February 19–20, 2007: "An outbreak of H5N1 detected at two farms near the Laotian capital Vientiane on Feb. 7 was reported."
- February 22, 2007: "H5N1 is been confirmed in eight suburban Moscow districts, a top Russian veterinary official said, as experts enforced a quarantine in several villages and sought to keep the disease from spreading. The virus, which began killing domestic birds in the Moscow suburbs on Feb. 9, has been traced to a single animal market just outside the capital."
- February 22, 2007:"Afghan authorities were culling poultry after an outbreak of the deadly H5N1 strain of bird flu in chicken in an eastern Afghan city, a U.N. official said Wednesday."
- February 25, 2007:Kuwait saw its first major outbreak of H5N1 avian influenza.
- February 28, 2007:"Myanmar reported that the H5N1 virus killed poultry at a farm about 5 miles from Rangoon, the country's largest city [...] The outbreak began 2 days ago, killing 68 of 1,360 layer chickens, ducks, and pullets, and officials attributed the outbreak to poor biosecurity on the farm, the report said. The remaining birds were destroyed, and authorities instituted several control measures including limiting poultry movement within the country, screening poultry, and disinfecting the affected area. Myanmar's last poultry outbreak was reported in April 2006."

== March ==
- March 5–6, 2007: "China reports bird flu struck a poultry market in the Tibetan capital of Lhasa, prompting the culling of nearly 7,000 birds. The outbreak began March 1."
- March 22, 2007: Bangladesh saw its first major outbreak of H5N1 avian influenza. "The virus was found in the birds from a poultry firm run by Bangladesh's National Airlines Biman, which has already culled 30,000 birds over the last few days."
- March 23, 2007: "Saudi Arabia's agriculture ministry has said the deadly H5N1 strain of bird flu had been discovered in [...] peacocks, turkeys, ostriches and parrots [and all] birds in the area had been culled. [...] The last reported cases of bird flu in Saudi Arabia involved 37 falcons in 2006. Last month, Saudi Arabia lifted bans going back to 2004 on poultry imports from 42 countries."

== April ==
- April 6, 2007: "A 13-year-old Cambodian girl dies from bird flu, bringing the country's death toll from the H5N1 virus to seven."

== May ==
- May 3, 2007:"Ghana's first case of the highly pathogenic H5N1 bird flu has been confirmed in sick chickens by local laboratories and a US naval laboratory in Egypt, a World Health Organization official said overnight. Some 1600 birds had already been incinerated as part of efforts to control the outbreak on a farm 20km east of Ghana's capital Accra, near the port of Tema".

== June ==
- June 5, 2007:" As Bangladesh battles to root out the lethal strain of bird flu known as H5N1 that has spread among its poultry flocks, the ability of the virus to thrive could be aided by the millions of ducks in that country."
- June 6, 2007: Malaysia joined the list of nations seeing a resurgence of bird deaths due to H5N1.
- June 12, 2007: "Indonesia finds traces of H5N1 in apparently healthy-looking poultry, making it tougher to detect the disease in the country hardest hit by the virus, officials said. Sick or dead chickens are used as a sign of H5N1 infection, but the appearance of "asymptomatic" chickens means humans could become more easily infected with bird flu."
- June 21, 2007: The Czech Republic saw its first major outbreak of H5N1 avian influenza.
- June 23, 2007: Togo saw its first major outbreak of H5N1 avian influenza. In Germany seven dead wild birds (five swans, one duck, one goose) tested positive for H5N1, the first such cases reported in Germany this year.

== July ==
- July 6, 2007: "German authorities discover H5N1 in domestic poultry for the first time this year. Officials say a goose in the town of Wickersdorf in the state of Thuringia was found to be infected."
- July 5, 2007:In July France joined the list of nations seeing a resurgence of bird deaths due to H5N1. Three dead swans in France were found to have the deadly form of H5N1.
- July 26, 2007:In July India joined the list of nations seeing a resurgence of bird deaths due to H5N1. The outbreak was reported in Manipur which borders the country of Myanmar. 132 chickens out of 144 died over a period of six days starting July 7. Over 150,000 birds within a five-km radius of the infected farm "will be culled in the next 10 days."

== August ==
- August 22, 2007: On August 22, 2007, an Indonesian woman, 28, chicken trader, was the 2nd person to die of bird flu in Bali, raising the death toll in the nation due to the disease to 84 (after 4 days of hospitalization). Tests in 2 local laboratories was positive for the H5N1 strain of the disease. 194 people — the majority of them in Indonesia died since 2003, according to the World Health Organization.

== September ==
- September 17, 2007: "In its first H5N1 bird flu outbreak since May, China's Ministry of Agriculture confirmed on its Web site that 36,130 ducks had been culled following the outbreak in Panyu district of the southern metropolis of Guangzhou, not far from Hong Kong."

== October ==
- October 8, 2007: ";An Indonesian Health Ministry official says a 44-year-old woman has died from bird flu after buying chickens at a local market, lifting the national death toll from the disease to 87."
- October 25, 2007: "Vietnam reports its third outbreak among poultry this month, this time in the village of Lung Na near the Chinese border. The virus has already struck duck farms in the central province of Quang Tri and Tra Vinh."

== November ==
- November 12, 2007: "An outbreak of bird flu in eastern England is the deadly H5N1 strain of the disease. The source of the outbreak had not yet been identified, acting chief veterinarian official Fred Landeg said. Officials said earlier that about 5,000 free-range turkeys, 1,000 ducks and 500 geese on the affected farm would be killed."
- November 29, 2007: "Authorities continue to conduct tests for bird flu in Romania's eastern Danube Delta, a day after they confirmed an outbreak of the virus in hens and ducks on a small farm in the village of Murighiol, a delta village 155 miles northeast of the capital, Bucharest."

== December ==
- December 1, 2007: "Three poultry farms northwest of Warsaw, Poland were cordoned off after the deadly H5N1 strain of bird flu was found in turkeys, officials said on Saturday. The cases were found at farms around the village of Brudzen near the city of Plock. Officials say the virus was most likely brought to Poland by migrating ducks, geese or swans."
- December 10, 2007: "Chinese health authorities said they were hunting for the causal link between a son and his father both struck by bird flu, but have found no evidence that the virus has mutated into a new strain. The 52-year old father was diagnosed with the H5N1 strain of bird flu late last week in the eastern province of Jiangsu, days after his 24-year old son died from the disease."
