= H5N1 genetic structure =

Genetic structure of Influenza A virus

The genetic structure of H5N1, a highly pathogenic avian influenza virus (influenza A virus subtype H5N1), is characterized by a segmented RNA genome consisting of eight gene segments that encode for various viral proteins essential for replication, host adaptation, and immune evasion.

== Virus ==
Influenza A virus subtype H5N1 (A/H5N1) is a subtype of the influenza A virus, which causes influenza (flu), predominantly in birds. It is enzootic (maintained in the population) in many bird populations, and also panzootic (affecting animals of many species over a wide area). A/H5N1 virus can also infect mammals (including humans) that have been exposed to infected birds; in these cases, symptoms are frequently severe or fatal. All subtypes of the influenza A virus share the same genetic structure and are potentially able to exchange genetic material by means of reassortment

A/H5N1 virus is shed in the saliva, mucus, and feces of infected birds; other infected animals may shed bird flu viruses in respiratory secretions and other body fluids (such as milk). The virus can spread rapidly through poultry flocks and among wild birds. An estimated half a billion farmed birds have been slaughtered in efforts to contain the virus.

Symptoms of A/H5N1 influenza vary according to both the strain of virus underlying the infection and on the species of bird or mammal affected. Classification as either Low Pathogenic Avian Influenza (LPAI) or High Pathogenic Avian Influenza (HPAI) is based on the severity of symptoms in domestic chickens and does not predict the severity of symptoms in other species. Chickens infected with LPAI A/H5N1 virus display mild symptoms or are asymptomatic, whereas HPAI A/H5N1 causes serious breathing difficulties, a significant drop in egg production, and sudden death.

In mammals, including humans, A/H5N1 influenza (whether LPAI or HPAI) is rare. Symptoms of infection vary from mild to severe, including fever, diarrhoea, and cough. Human infections with A/H5N1 virus have been reported in 23 countries since 1997, resulting in severe pneumonia and death in about 50% of cases. Between 2003 and December 2025, the World Health Organization has recorded 993 cases of confirmed H5N1 influenza, leading to 477 deaths. The true fatality rate may be lower because some cases with mild symptoms may not have been identified as H5N1.

A/H5N1 influenza virus was first identified in farmed birds in southern China in 1996. Between 1996 and 2018, A/H5N1 coexisted in bird populations with other subtypes of the virus, but since then, the highly pathogenic subtype HPAI A(H5N1) has become the dominant strain in bird populations worldwide. Some strains of A/H5N1 which are highly pathogenic to chickens have adapted to cause mild symptoms in ducks and geese, and are able to spread rapidly through bird migration. Mammal species that have been recorded with H5N1 infection include cows, seals, goats, and skunks.

Due to the high lethality and virulence of HPAI A(H5N1), its worldwide presence, its increasingly diverse host reservoir, and its significant ongoing mutations, the H5N1 virus is regarded as the world's largest pandemic threat. Domestic poultry may potentially be protected from specific strains of the virus by vaccination. In the event of a serious outbreak of H5N1 flu among humans, health agencies have prepared "candidate" vaccines that may be used to prevent infection and control the outbreak; however, it could take several months to ramp up mass production.

== Nomenclature ==
Due to the high variability of the virus, subtyping is not sufficient to uniquely identify a strain of influenza A virus. To unambiguously describe a specific isolate of virus, researchers use the Influenza virus nomenclature, which describes, among other things, the subtype, year, and place of collection. Some examples include:

- A/Rio de Janeiro/62434/2021 (H3N2).
  - The starting A indicates that the virus is an influenza A virus.
  - Rio de Janeiro indicates the place of collection. 62434 is a laboratory sequence number. 2021 (or just 21) indicates that the sample was collected in 2021. No species is mentioned so by default, the sample was collected from a human.
  - (H3N2) indicates the subtype of the virus.
- A/swine/South Dakota/152B/2009 (H1N2).
  - This example shows an additional field before the place: swine. It indicates that the sample was collected from a pig.
- A/California/04/2009 A(H1N1)pdm09.
  - This example carries an unusual designation in the last part: instead of a usual (H1N1), it uses A(H1N1)pdm09. This was in order to distinguish the Pandemic H1N1/09 virus lineage from older H1N1 viruses.

Because of the impact of avian influenza on economically important chicken farms, a classification system was devised in 1981 which divided avian virus strains as either highly pathogenic (and therefore potentially requiring vigorous control measures) or low pathogenic. The test for this is based solely on the effect on chickens – a virus strain is highly pathogenic avian influenza (HPAI) if 75% or more of chickens die after being deliberately infected with it. The alternative classification is low pathogenic avian influenza (LPAI). This classification system has since been modified to take into account the structure of the virus' haemagglutinin protein. Other species of birds, especially water birds, can become infected with HPAI virus without experiencing severe symptoms and can spread the infection over large distances; the exact symptoms depend on the species of bird and the strain of virus. Classification of an avian virus strain as HPAI or LPAI does not predict how serious the disease might be if it infects humans or other mammals.

Since 2006, the World Organization for Animal Health requires all LPAI H5 and H7 detections to be reported because of their potential to mutate into highly pathogenic strains.

== Structure and genome ==
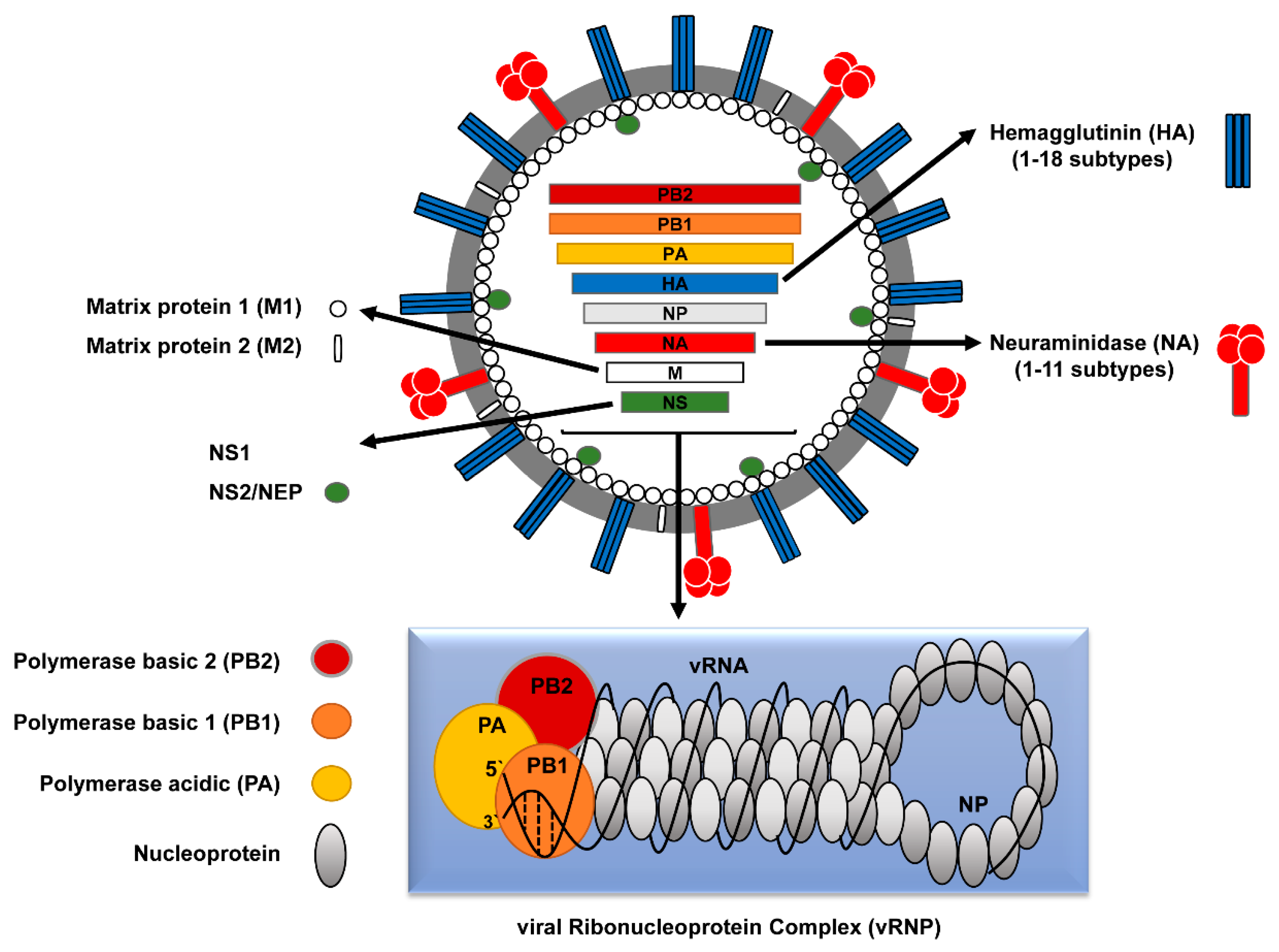
Influenza A virus structure

=== Structure ===
The influenza A virus has a negative-sense, single-stranded, segmented RNA genome, enclosed in a lipid envelope. The virus particle (also called the virion) is 80–120 nanometers in diameter such that the smallest virions adopt an elliptical shape; larger virions have a filamentous shape.

Core - The central core of the virion contains the viral RNA genome, which is made of eight separate segments. The nucleoprotein (NP) coats the viral RNA to form a ribonucleoprotein that assumes a helical (spiral) configuration. Three large proteins (PB_{1}, PB_{2}, and PA), which are responsible for RNA transcription and replication, are bound to each segment of viral RNP.

Capsid - The matrix protein M1 forms a layer between the nucleoprotein and the envelope, called the capsid.

Envelope - The viral envelope consists of a lipid bilayer derived from the host cell. Two viral proteins; hemagglutinin (HA) and neuraminidase (NA), are inserted into the envelope and are exposed as spikes on the surface of the virion. Both proteins are antigenic; a host's immune system can react to them and produce antibodies in response. The M2 protein forms an ion channel in the envelope and is responsible for uncoating the virion once it has bound to a host cell.

=== Genome ===
The table below presents a concise summary of the influenza genome and the principal functions of the proteins which are encoded. Segments are conventionally numbered from 1 to 8 in descending order of length.

RNA Segment	Length	Protein	Function
1- PB2	2341	PB2 (Polymerase Basic 2)	A component of the viral RNA polymerase. PB2 also inhibits JAK1/STAT signaling to inhibit host innate immune response
2- PB1	2341	PB1 (Polymerase Basic 1)	A component of the viral RNA polymerase. It also degrades the host cell's mitochondrial antiviral signaling protein
2- PB1	2341	PB1-F2 (Polymerase Basic 1-Frame 2)	An accessory protein of most IAVs. Not needed for virus replication and growth, it interferes with the host immune response.
3- PA	2233	PA (Polymerase Acid)	A component of the viral RNA polymerase
		PA-X	Arises from a ribosomal frameshift in the PA segment. Inhibits innate host immune responses, such as cytokine and interferon production.
4- HA	1775	HA (Hemagglutinin)	Part of the viral envelope, a protein that binds the virion to host cells, enabling the virus's RNA genetic material to invade it
5- NP	1565	NP (Nucleoprotein)	The nucleoprotein associates with the viral RNA to form a ribonucleoprotein (RNP). At the early stage of infection, the RNP binds to the host cell's importin-α which transports it into the host cell nucleus, where the viral RNA is transcribed and replicated. At a later stage of infection, newly manufactured viral RNA segments assemble with the NP protein and polymerase (PB1, PB2 and PA) to form the core of a progeny virion
6- NA	1409	NA (Neuraminidase)	Part of the viral envelope. NA enables the newly assembled virions to escape the host cell and go on to propagate the infection. NA also facilitates the movement of infective virus particles through mucus, enabling them to reach host epithelial cells.
7- M	1027	M1 (Matrix Protein 1)	Forms the capsid, which coats the viral nucleoproteins and supports the structure of the viral envelope. M1 also assists with the function of the NEP protein.
7- M	1027	M2 (Matrix Protein 2)	Forms a proton channel in the viral envelope, which is activated once a virion has bound to a host cell. This uncoats the virus, exposing its infective contents to the cytoplasm of the host cell
8- NS	890	NS1 (non-structural protein 1)	Counteracts the host's natural immune response and inhibits interferon production.
8- NS	890	NEP (Nuclear Export Protein, formerly NS2 non-structural protein 2)	Cooperates with the M1 protein to mediate the export of viral RNA copies from nucleus into cytoplasm in the late stage of viral replication

Three viral proteins - PB1, PB2, and PA - associate to form the RNA-dependent RNA polymerase (RdRp) which functions to transcribe and replicate the viral RNA.

Viral messenger RNA Transcription - The RdRp complex transcribes viral mRNAs by using a mechanism called cap-snatching. It consists in the hijacking and cleavage of host capped pre-mRNAs. Host cell mRNA is cleaved near the cap to yield a primer for the transcription of positive-sense viral mRNA using the negative-sense viral RNA as a template. The host cell then transports the viral mRNA into the cytoplasm where ribosomes manufacture the viral proteins.

Replication of the viral RNA -The replication of the influenza genome involves two steps. The RdRp first of all transcribes the negative-sense viral genome into a positive-sense complimentary RNA (cRNA), then the cRNAs are used as templates to transcribe new negative-sense vRNA copies. These are exported from the nucleus and assemble near the cell membrane to form the core of new virions.

== Surface encoding gene segments ==
All influenza A viruses have two gene segments titled HA and NA which code for the antigenic proteins hemagglutin and neuraminidase which are located on the external envelope of the virus.

=== HA ===
HA codes for hemagglutinin, which is an antigenic glycoprotein found on the surface of the influenza viruses and is responsible for binding the virus to the cell that is being infected. Hemagglutinin forms spikes at the surface of flu viruses that function to attach viruses to cells. This attachment is required for efficient transfer of flu virus genes into cells, a process that can be blocked by antibodies that bind to the hemagglutinin proteins. One genetic factor in distinguishing between human flu viruses and avian flu viruses is that avian influenza HA bind to alpha 2-3 sialic acid receptors while human influenza HA bind alpha 2-6 sialic acid receptors.

=== NA ===
NA codes for neuraminidase which is an antigenic glycoprotein enzyme found on the surface of the influenza viruses. It helps the release of progeny viruses from infected cells. The antiviral drugs Tamiflu and Relenza work by inhibiting some strains of neuraminidase.

== Matrix encoding gene segments ==
=== M ===
M codes for the matrix proteins (M1 and M2) that, along with the two surface proteins (hemagglutinin and neuraminidase), make up the capsid (protective coat) of the virus. It encodes by using different reading frames from the same RNA segment.

- The matrix protein M1 forms the capsid, which coats the viral nucleoproteins and supports the structure of the viral envelope. M1 also assists with the function of the NEP protein.
- The M2 protein forms a proton channel in the viral envelope that uncoats the virus, thereby exposing its contents (the eight RNA segments) to the cytoplasm of the host cell. The M2 transmembrane protein is an ion channel required for efficient infection.

== Nucleoprotein encoding gene segments. ==
=== NP ===
NP codes for a structural protein which encapsidates the negative strand viral RNA.

=== NS ===
NS codes for two nonstructural proteins (NS1 and Nuclear Export Protein NEP - formerly called NS2).

- NS1 counteracts the host's natural immune response and inhibits interferon production.
- NEP mediates the export of influenza virus ribonucleoprotein (RNP) complexes from the nucleus into the cytoplasm, where they are assembled.

== Polymerase encoding gene segments ==
=== PA ===
PA codes for the PA protein which is a component of the viral polymerase.

=== PB1 ===
PB1 codes for the PB1 protein and the PB1-F2 protein.

- The PB1 protein is a component of the viral polymerase.
- The PB1-F2 protein is encoded by an alternative open reading frame of the PB1 RNA segment

=== PB2 ===
PB2 codes for the PB2 protein which is a component of the viral polymerase.

== Mutation ==
Influenza viruses have a relatively high mutation rate that is characteristic of RNA viruses. The segmentation of the influenza A virus genome facilitates genetic recombination by segment reassortment in hosts who become infected with two different strains of influenza viruses at the same time. With reassortment between strains, an avian strain which does not affect humans may acquire characteristics from a different strain which enable it to infect and pass between humans – a zoonotic event. It is thought that all influenza A viruses causing outbreaks or pandemics among humans since the 1900s originated from strains circulating in wild aquatic birds through reassortment with other influenza strains. It is possible (though not certain) that pigs may act as an intermediate host for reassortment.

The Global Influenza Surveillance and Response System (GISRS) is a global network of laboratories that monitor the spread of influenza with the aim to provide the World Health Organization with influenza control information and to inform vaccine development. Several millions of specimens are tested by the GISRS network annually through a network of laboratories in 127 countries. As well as human viruses, GISRS also monitors avian, swine, and other potentially zoonotic influenza viruses.

== See also ==
- Fujian flu
- Goose Guangdong virus
- Orthomyxoviridae
- PB2 E627K mutation
