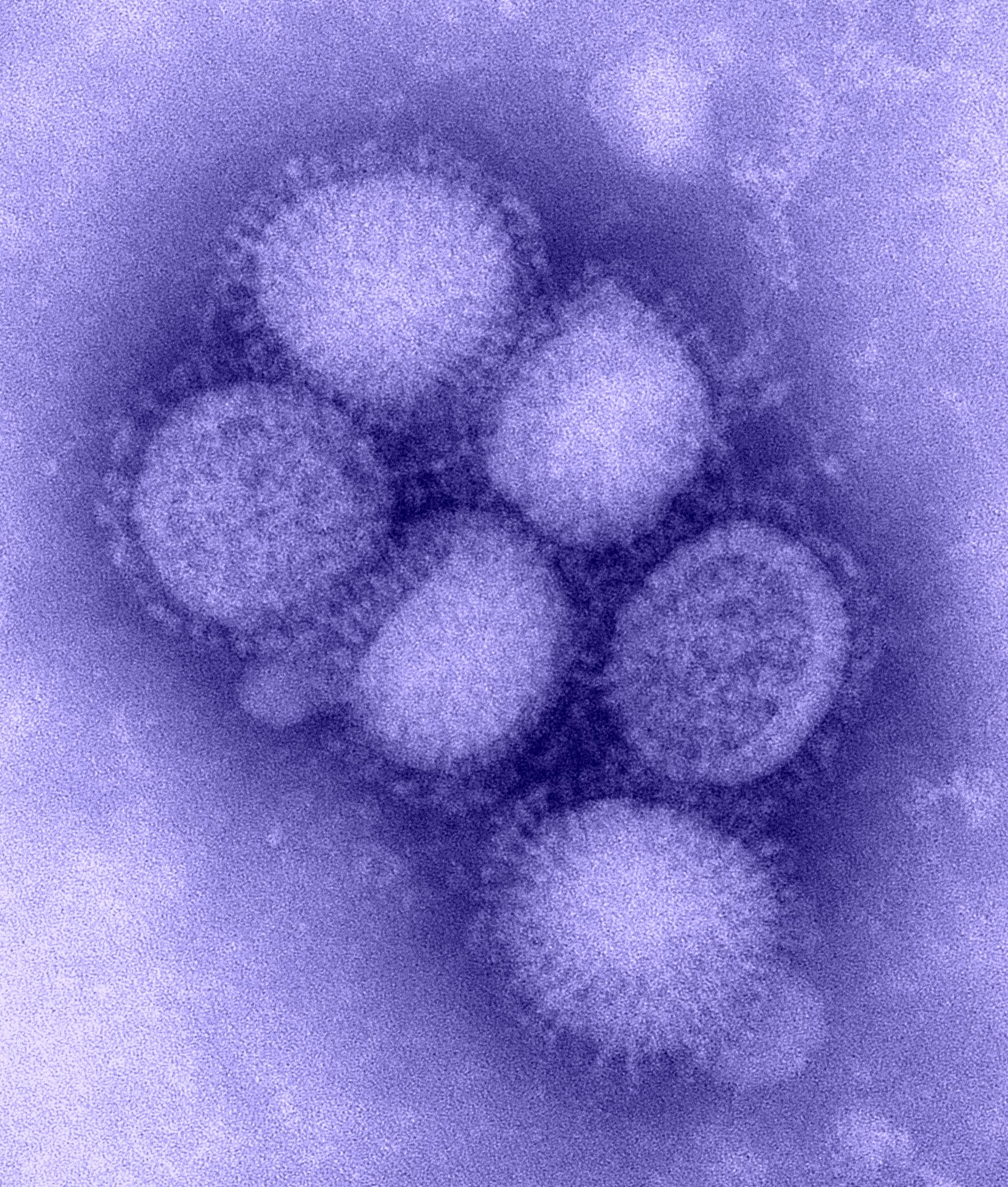
- Transmission electron micrograph of the pandemic H1N1/09 influenza virus photographed at the CDC Influenza Laboratory. The viruses are 80–120 nanometres in diameter.

Virus classification
- (unranked): Virus
- Realm: Riboviria
- Kingdom: Orthornavirae
- Phylum: Negarnaviricota
- Class: Insthoviricetes
- Order: Articulavirales
- Family: Orthomyxoviridae
- Genus: Alphainfluenzavirus
- Species: Influenza A virus
- Strain: Pandemic H1N1/09 virus

= Pandemic H1N1/09 virus =

Virus responsible for the 2009 swine flu pandemic

The pandemic H1N1/09 virus is a swine origin influenza A virus subtype H1N1 strain that was responsible for the 2009 swine flu pandemic. This strain is often called swine flu by the public media due to the prevailing belief that it originated in pigs. The virus is believed to have originated around September 2008 in central Mexico.

The H1N1 pandemic of 2009 was the first public health emergency of international concern designated by the World Health Organization. While H1N1/09 was the primary strain of flu seen that year, it was not unusually contagious or lethal.

Most cases were mild, although those who had to be hospitalized were often severely ill. In the fall of 2009, between 15 and 33% of those hospitalized with H1N1 in the Southern Hemisphere were taken to the ICU. One clinician remarked that the pandemic was "like two diseases" because of the stark difference between mild and severe cases, with few falling in between.

== Viral characteristics ==
The virus is a novel strain of the influenza virus, for which existing vaccines against seasonal flu provided no protection. A study at the U.S. Centers for Disease Control and Prevention (CDC) published in May 2009 found that children had no preexisting immunity to the new strain but that adults, particularly those over 60, had some degree of immunity. Children showed no cross-reactive antibody reaction to the then-new strain, while adults aged 18 to 64 had 6–9%, and older adults 34%. Much reporting of early analysis repeated that the strain contained genes from five different flu viruses: North American swine influenza, North American avian influenza, human influenza, and two swine influenza viruses typically found in Asia and Europe. Further analysis showed that several of the proteins of the virus are most similar to strains that cause mild symptoms in humans, leading virologist Wendy Barclay to suggest that the virus was unlikely to cause severe symptoms for most people. Other leading researchers indicated that all segments of the virus were in fact swine in origin, despite it being a multiple reassortment. The first complete genome sequence of the pandemic strain was deposited in public databases on April 27, 2009, by scientists from the U.S. Centers for Disease Control and Prevention in Atlanta. Scientists in Winnipeg later completed the full genetic sequencing of viruses from Mexico and Canada on May 6, 2009.

=== Viral origins ===
Analysis of the genetic divergence of the virus in samples from different cases indicated that the virus jumped to humans in 2008, probably after June, and not later than the end of November, likely around September 2008. A report by researchers at the Mount Sinai School of Medicine in 2016 found that the 2009 H1N1 virus likely originated from pigs in a very small region of central Mexico.

On April 17, 2009, the Centers for Disease Control and Prevention (CDC) determined that two cases of febrile respiratory illness occurring in children who resided in adjacent counties in Southern California were caused by infection with a swine influenza A (H1N1) virus. The viruses from the two cases were closely related genetically, resistant to amantadine and rimantadine, and contain a unique combination of gene segments that previously had not been reported among swine or human influenza viruses in the United States or elsewhere. After the emergence of the novel virus in the spring of 2009, it spread quickly across the United States, Mexico and the world.

In late April, the World Health Organization (WHO) declared its first ever "public health emergency of international concern", or PHEIC, and in June, the WHO and the U.S. CDC stopped counting cases and declared the outbreak a pandemic.

On June 23, 2009, The New York Times reported that U.S. federal agriculture officials believed that, "contrary to the popular assumption that the new swine flu pandemic arose on factory farms in Mexico", now believe it "most likely emerged in pigs in Asia, but then traveled to North America in a human". They emphasized that there was no way to prove their hypothesis but said there is no evidence this new virus, which combines Eurasian and North American genes, has never circulated in North American pigs, "while there is tantalizing evidence that a closely related 'sister virus' has circulated in Asia". However, a subsequent report by researchers at the Mount Sinai School of Medicine in 2016 found that the 2009 H1N1 virus likely originated in central Mexico.

In early June 2009, using computational methods developed over the previous ten years, an international team of researchers attempted to reconstruct the origins and timescale of the 2009 flu pandemic. Oliver Pybus of Oxford University's Department of Zoology, and part of the research team, claims "Our results show that this strain has been circulating among pigs, possibly among multiple continents, for many years prior to its transmission to humans." The research team who worked on this case also believed it was "derived from several viruses circulating in swine", and that the initial transmission to humans occurred several months before recognition of the outbreak. The team concluded that "despite widespread influenza surveillance in humans, the lack of systematic swine surveillance allowed for the undetected persistence and evolution of this potentially pandemic strain for many years."

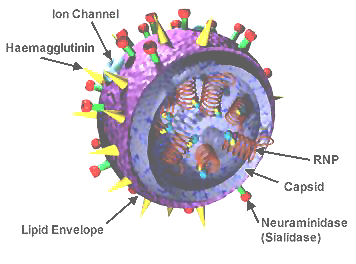
Structure of the influenza virion. The hemagglutinin (HA) and neuraminidase (NA) proteins show on the surface of the particle. The viral RNAs that make up the genome show as red coils inside the particle and bound to ribonucleoproteins (RNPs).

According to the researchers, movement of live pigs between Eurasia and North America "seems to have facilitated the mixing of diverse swine influenza viruses, leading to the multiple reassortment events associated with the genesis of the (new H1N1) strain". They also said this new pandemic "provides further evidence of the role of domestic pigs in the ecosystem of influenza A".

In November 2009, a study was published in Virology Journal in which it was suggested that the virus may be the product of three strains from three continents that swapped genes in a lab or a vaccine-making plant, and subsequently "escaped". The study followed debate among researchers in May 2009, when the authors asked the World Health Organization (WHO) to consider the hypothesis. After reviewing the initial paper, WHO and other organizations concluded the pandemic strain was a naturally occurring virus and not laboratory-derived.

=== Contagiousness ===
The virus is contagious with an R_{0} of 1.4 to 1.6 and spreads from human to human in much the same way as seasonal flu. The most common mechanisms by which it spreads are by droplets from coughs and sneezes of infected people, and also potentially touching a surface or the hand of a person contaminated with the virus and then touching one's eyes, nose or mouth. In 2009, the WHO reported that H1N1/09 seemed to be more contagious than seasonal flu. However, a New England Journal of Medicine report said the transmissibility of the 2009 H1N1 influenza virus in households was lower than that seen in past pandemics. The U.S. CDC recommended that people should wait at least a day after their fever subsides (usually 3–4 days after the onset of symptoms) before resuming normal activities, but it has been found that they can continue to shed virus for several more days.

=== Virulence ===
The virulence of swine flu virus is mild and the mortality rates are very low.

In mid-2009, the U.S. CDC noted that most infections were mild, similar to seasonal flu, and that recovery tended to be fairly quick. The number of deaths as of September 2009 was said to be a tiny fraction of the annual number of deaths from seasonal flu. However, comparisons of human fatality figures with seasonal influenza are prone to underestimate impact of the pandemic, and the pandemic H1N1/09 virus was in fact the dominant strain of influenza causing illness in the 2009/10 flu season.

Research carried out at Imperial College London has shown that, unlike seasonal flu, H1N1/09 can infect cells deep in the lungs. Seasonal flu can infect only cells with receptor type a2-6 which are typically located in the nose and throat but H1N1/09 can also infect cells with receptor type a2-3. This may explain why some patients experience severe respiratory symptoms. (The H5N1 virus is also able to infect cells deep in the lungs with receptor type a2-3 but cannot infect cells with receptor type a2-6 making it less contagious than H1N1/09.)

As of September 2009, most people infected by this flu suffered a mild illness, but the small minority hospitalized were often severely ill. Arand Kumar, an intensive care expert at the University of Manitoba, Winnipeg, Canada, said "this pandemic is like two diseases; either you're off work for a few days or you go to hospital, often to the intensive-care unit (ICU). There's no middle ground." In the southern hemisphere 15 to 33% of hospitalized cases went to the ICU in July and August 2009. Unlike H5N1 avian flu and SARS which provoke a runaway body-wide immune response, H1N1/09 destroys the lungs' alveoli, often causing acute respiratory distress syndrome, which kills in half of all cases. Preliminary research suggests that severity is linked to a genetic variation in immune systems.

From April 2009 to November 2009, 3,900 people died of the H1N1 pandemic virus in the U.S. This is sometimes compared to the 36,000 people per year who die from the "common flu", mostly in winter, although this number is an estimate. The death rate of H1N1 in the U.S. was calculated as less than 0.02% from November 2009 figures from the CDC, and has been explicitly calculated as 0.026% in England.

=== Vaccine ===
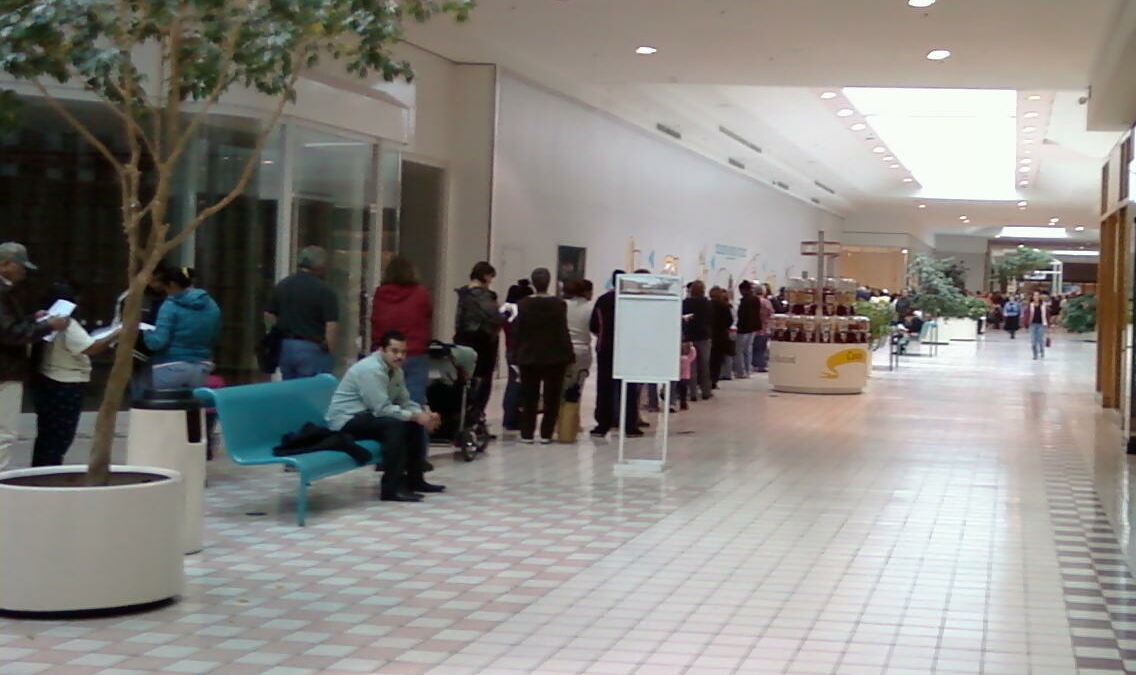
2,500 people line up in a mall in Texas City, Texas to receive the H1N1 vaccine from the Galveston County Health Department.

A study at the U.S. Centers for Disease Control and Prevention published in May 2009 found that children had no preexisting immunity to the new strain but that adults, particularly those older than 60, had some degree of immunity. Children showed no cross-reactive antibody reaction to the new strain, adults aged 18 to 60 had 6–9%, and older adults 33%. While it has been thought that these findings suggest the partial immunity in older adults may be due to previous exposure to similar seasonal influenza viruses, a November 2009 study of a rural unvaccinated population in China found only a 0.3% cross-reactive antibody reaction to the H1N1 strain, suggesting that previous vaccinations for seasonal flu and not exposure may have resulted in the immunity found in the older U.S. population. Production may be three billion doses per year rather than the earlier estimate of five billion.

=== Evolutionary potential ===
On May 22, 2009, World Health Organization (WHO) Director-General Margaret Chan said the virus must be closely monitored in the southern hemisphere, as it could mix with ordinary seasonal influenza and change in unpredictable ways. Experts writing in the July issue of The New England Journal of Medicine noted that historically, pandemic viruses have evolved between seasons, and the current strain may become more severe or transmissible in the coming months. They therefore stressed the importance of international cooperation to engage in proper surveillance to help monitor changes in the virus's behavior, which will aid in both "vaccine targeting" and interpreting illness patterns in the fall of 2009.

Other experts in 2009 were also concerned that the new virus strain could mutate over the coming months. Guan Yi, a leading virologist from the University of Hong Kong, for instance, described the new H1N1 influenza virus as "very unstable", meaning it could mix and swap genetic material (reassortment) when exposed to other viruses. During an interview he said, "Both H1N1 and H5N1 are unstable so the chances of them exchanging genetic material are higher, whereas a stable (seasonal flu) virus is less likely to take on genetic material." The H5N1 virus is mostly limited to birds, but in rare cases when it infects humans it has a mortality rate of between 60% and 70%. Experts worry about the emergence of a hybrid of the more virulent Asian-lineage HPAI (highly pathogenic avian influenza) A/H5N1 strain (media labeled "bird flu") with more human-transmissible influenza A strains such as this novel 2009 swine-origin A/H1N1 strain (media labeled "swine flu"), especially since the H5N1 strain is endemic among birds in countries like China, Indonesia, Vietnam and Egypt. (See the suite of H5N1 articles for details.)

Other studies concluded that the virus was likely well adapted to humans, had a clear biological advantage over seasonal flu strains and that reassortment was unlikely at that time due to its ease in replication and transmission. However, Federal health officials in the U.S. noted that the horrific 1918 flu epidemic, which killed hundreds of thousands in the United States alone, was preceded by a mild "herald" wave of cases in the spring, followed by devastating waves of illness in the autumn. As of late July 2009, U.S. health officials said the swine flu wasn't yet mutating to become more dangerous, but they were closely tracking that as the virus continued to circle the globe.

As of October 2009, research done by Taubenberger showed that the evolution of A (H1N1) is relatively slow since the structure of the 2009 H1N1 virus is similar to the strain of H1N1 implicated in the 1918 flu pandemic. A study from Hokkaido University found a sequence homology between the Hemagglutinin antigen amino acid residues found in the earlier 1918 strain and the 2009 H1N1 strain. This may have played a role in individuals who had been infected with the 1918 strain and its early descendants in showing stronger specific immunity to the 2009 H1N1 virus. This finding provided insight into future monitoring of the H1N1 virus and its evolution within the human population.

=== Mutation ===
On November 20, 2013, the Norwegian Institute of Public Health released a statement saying they had discovered a potentially significant mutation in the H1N1 influenza strain that could be responsible for causing the severest symptoms among those infected. In the statement they said "The mutation could be affecting the virus' ability to go deeper into the respiratory system, thus causing more serious illness".

The World Health Organization said the mutation did not appear to be widespread in Norway and the virus in its mutated form remained sensitive to antivirals and pandemic vaccines. A similar mutation had been detected in H1N1 viruses circulating in several other countries, including China and the United States, in severe as well as in some mild cases. "Although further investigation is under way, no evidence currently suggests that these mutations are leading to an unusual increase in the number of H1N1 infections or a greater number of severe or fatal cases."

On December 2, 2009, the WHO announced that they had been informed of two recent clusters of patients infected with oseltamivir-resistant H1N1 viruses. Both clusters, detected in the UK (including Wales) and in North Carolina, occurred in a single ward and involved patients whose immune systems were severely compromised or suppressed. Transmission of resistant virus from one patient to another is suspected in both outbreaks.

=== Resistance ===
As of December 2010, the WHO reported 314 samples of 2009 pandemic H1N1 flu tested worldwide have shown resistance to oseltamivir (Tamiflu). This was not totally unexpected as 99.6% of the seasonal H1N1 flu strains tested have developed resistance to amantadine and rimantadine. As of August 2009 no circulating flu had yet shown any resistance to zanamivir (Relenza), the other available anti-viral.

=== Species affected ===
Pigs

Before being transmitted to humans, a H1N1 type virus is known to have circulated in swine. In August 2007, about 25 people and 160 pigs developed flu at a county fair in Ohio. Analysis showed they were infected with the same strain—a H1N1 type containing genes of human, bird and swine origin. A 2004 study found that in Iowa, 20 percent of swine veterinarians and 3 percent of meatpackers, but no university workers, had antibodies in their blood indicating they had been infected with swine flu. Another study, of 804 rural Iowans, found that pig farmers were 50 times more likely, and their spouses about 30 times more likely, than university workers to carry swine flu antibodies. Pigs are also known to have been infected by humans.

Humans

Humans have been affected since early 2009. The November 27, 2009 worldwide update by the U.N.'s World Health Organization (WHO) states that "more than 207 countries and overseas territories or communities have reported laboratory confirmed cases of pandemic influenza H1N1 2009, including over 7,820 deaths". The WHO has also tracked more than 622,482 laboratory-confirmed cases of H1N1. The symptoms of this virus are identical to that of seasonal influenza.

Birds

In late August 2009, the government of Chile discovered that the human H1N1/09 virus had jumped, unmutated, to birds, "opening a new chapter in the global epidemic". Top flu and animal-health experts with the WHO and the CDC were monitoring the situation closely. They said the infected turkeys had suffered only mild effects, easing concern about a potentially dangerous development. Chile's turkey meat remained safe to eat, they said, and so far there had been no signs of a potentially dangerous mutation. Virus experts were concerned that a more dangerous and easily transmitted strain could emerge if H1N1/09 combines again with avian flu, which is far more virulent but much less contagious to humans. By October 2009, another outbreak was identified at a turkey breeder in Ontario, Canada.

Other animals

In October 2009, a ferret exhibiting flu symptoms was confirmed to have contracted the H1N1 virus from its owner in Oregon. In November 2009, a case of novel H1N1 was confirmed in a household cat. Although the earliest cat fatality from the H1N1 virus in the U.S. occurred in Pennsylvania, the Oregon Veterinary Medical Association was the first to confirm a cat fatality in the U.S. The association recommended that cat owners with flu symptoms avoid touching cat's eyes, nose, and mouth while sick. They recommended thoroughly washing hands after handling a sick pet as it might be possible for cats to transmit the virus to humans. This was the third confirmed case of H1N1 in a cat in the U.S.; other cases have occurred in Utah and Iowa. The first case of a dog with H1N1 was reported in December 2009. On July 22, 2011 the Norwegian Veterinary Institute reported the first occurrence of 2009-H1N1 influenza virus in minks.

=== Nomenclature ===
The initial outbreak of a novel swine-origin H1N1 flu pandemic in 2009 and the virus strain that caused it were called by many names. In July 2009, WHO experts named the virus "pandemic H1N1/09 virus" to distinguish it from both various seasonal H1N1 virus strains and the 1918 flu pandemic H1N1 strain.

Some authorities objected to calling the flu outbreak "swine flu". U.S. Agriculture Secretary Tom Vilsack expressed concerns that this would lead to the misconception that pork is unsafe for consumption. The CDC began referring to it as "novel influenza A (H1N1)"; "A/H1N1" is sometimes used. The CDC stopped using the nomenclature "novel H1N1" and updated various web pages to reflect the change to "2009 H1N1 Flu". In the Netherlands it was originally called "pig flu" but, later called "Mexican flu" by the National Health Institute and in the media. South Korea and Israel briefly considered calling it the "Mexican virus". Later the South Korean press used "SI", short for "swine influenza". Taiwan suggested the names "H1N1 flu" or "new flu", which most local media adopted. The World Organisation for Animal Health proposed the name "North American influenza". The European Commission adopted the term "novel flu virus".

The name A(H1N1)pdm09 later came into widespread use, sometimes qualified as A/California/7/2009(H1N1)pdm, etc.

The pdm09 in the above nomenclature refers to Pandemic Disease Mexico 2009.

== Genetics ==
Genetic origins of the 2009 swine flu virus
HA	Hemagglutinin	swine (H1)	North America
NA	Neuraminidase	swine (N1)	Europe
PA	RNA polymerase subunit PA	avian	North America
PB1	RNA polymerase subunit PB1	human	1993 H3N2 strain
PB2	RNA polymerase subunit PB2	avian	North America
NP	Nucleoprotein	swine	North America
M	Matrix protein M1, M2	swine	Eurasia
NS/NEP	Non-structural proteins NS1, NEP (Nuclear Export Protein)	swine	North America
Source: "The identity card of a composite virus" (in French). Le Monde. 2009-04-29.

On April 24, 2009, the U.S. CDC determined that seven samples from suspected cases in Mexico matched the strain that had infected patients in Texas and California with no known linkages to animals or one another; the strain appeared to be spreading from human to human. The CDC determined that the strain contained genes from four different flu viruses—North American swine influenza, North American avian influenza, human influenza, and swine influenza virus typically found in Asia and Europe—"an unusually mongrelised mix of genetic sequences". A CDC investigative team arrived in Mexico City on April 25, 2009 to work with Mexican counterparts to study the virus.

Pigs are susceptible to influenza viruses that can also infect both humans and birds, so they may act as a "mixing vessel" in which reassortment can occur between flu viruses of several species. Reassortment is a process that happens if two different types of influenza virus infect a single cell and it can produce a new strain of influenza. This is because the virus genome is split between eight independent pieces of RNA, which allows pieces of RNA from different viruses to mix and form a novel type of virus as new virus particles are being assembled. This new strain appears to be a result of the reassortment of two swine influenza viruses, one from North America and one from Europe. But the North American pig strain was itself the product of previous reassortments, and has carried an avian PB2 gene for at least ten years and a human PB1 gene since 1993. These genes were passed on to the new virus.

Gene sequences for every viral gene were made available through the Global Initiative on Sharing Avian Influenza Data (GISAID). A preliminary analysis found that the hemagglutinin (HA) gene was similar to that of swine flu viruses present in U.S. pigs since 1999, but the neuraminidase (NA) and matrix protein (M) genes resembled versions present in European swine flu isolates. While viruses with this genetic makeup had not previously been found to be circulating in humans or pigs, there is no formal national surveillance system to determine what viruses are circulating in pigs in the U.S. So far, little is known about the spread of the virus in any pig population. A preliminary analysis has also shown that several of the proteins involved in the pathophysiology of the virus are most similar to strains that cause mild symptoms in humans. This suggests the virus is unlikely to cause severe infections similar to those caused by the 1918 pandemic flu virus or the H5N1 avian influenza.

Late on May 6, 2009, Canada's National Microbiology Laboratory first completed the sequencing of Mexican samples of the virus, publishing the result to GenBank as A/Mexico/InDRE4487/2009(H1N1). This was later shown to be nearly identical to A/California/07/2009 (H1N1), the strain from California sequenced and published by the CDC on 27 April. Samples from Mexico, Nova Scotia and Ontario had the same sequence, ruling out genetic explanations for the greater severity of the Mexican cases.

The genetic divergence of the virus in samples from different cases has been analysed by an international collaboration who found that the virus jumped to humans in 2008, probably after June, and not later than the end of November. The research also indicated the virus had been latent in pigs for several months prior to the outbreak, suggesting a need to increase agricultural surveillance to prevent future outbreaks.

== See also ==
- 2009 flu pandemic
- 2009 flu pandemic in Mexico
- COVID-19 pandemic
- Public health
- Swine influenza
