= Influenza Antiviral Drug Search =

Distributed computing project

The Influenza Antiviral Drug Search was a distributed computing project that was running on the BOINC platform. It is a project of the University of Texas Medical Branch.

== Project purpose ==
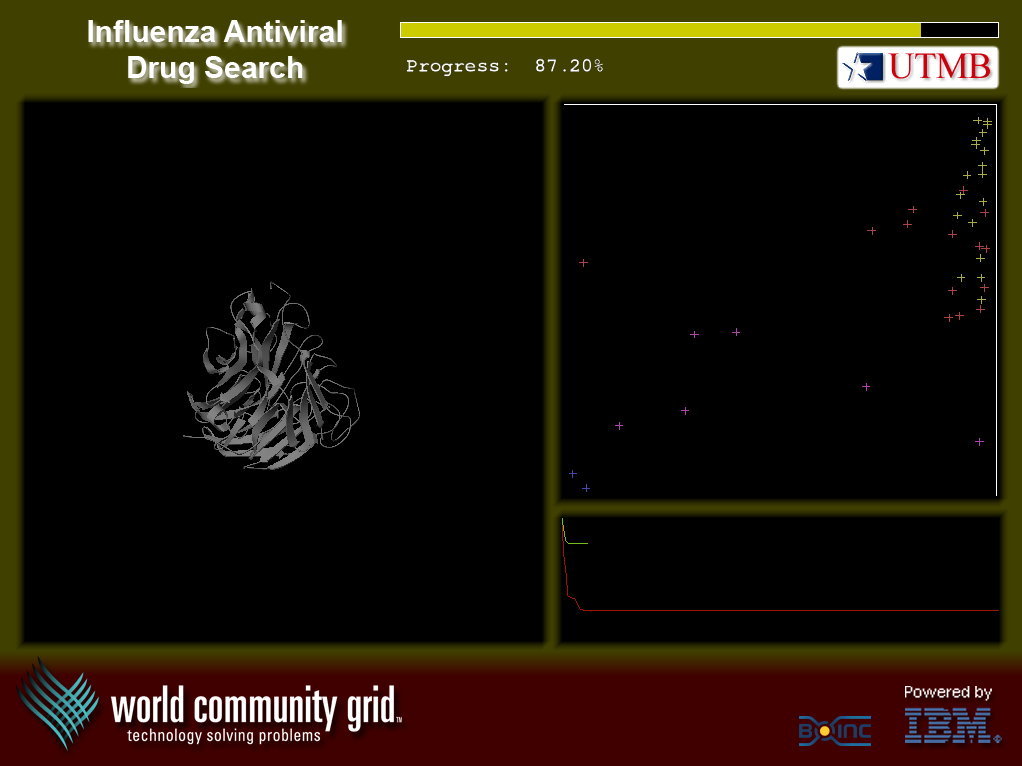
WCG screensaver, Influenza Antiviral Drug Search

The Influenza Antiviral Drug Search conducted millions of virtual docking experiments in order to discover compounds that may be suitable for real-world clinical trials to combat new or drug resistant strains of influenza virus.

One vulnerability of all influenza strains is that they need viral neuraminidase, NS1 Influenza Protein and hemagglutinin in order to infect a body. A chemical compound that can disable one of these molecules has the potential to be an effective antiviral drug.

== See also ==
- BOINC
- List of distributed computing projects
- World Community Grid
