= Tegument =

Tegument may refer to:

- Integumentary system, a protective organ system forming the outermost layer of an animal's body
- Tegument (helminth), an outer covering characteristic of flatworms
- Viral tegument, or viral matrix, a protein lining surrounding the nucleocapsid of herpesviruses
