= M1 protein =

Flu_M1
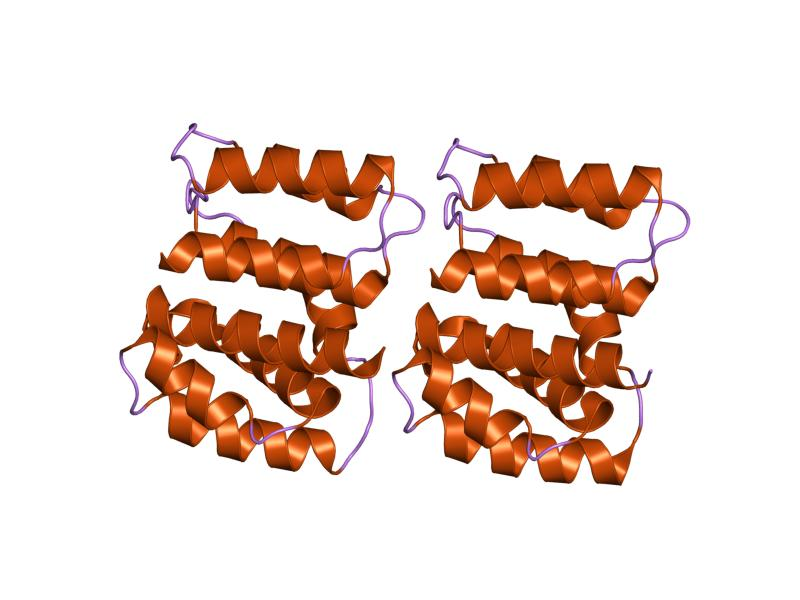
- influenza virus m1 protein

Identifiers
- Symbol: Flu_M1
- Pfam: PF00598
- InterPro: IPR001561
- SCOP2: 1aa7 / SCOPe / SUPFAM
- OPM superfamily: 42
- OPM protein: 1aa7
Available protein structures:
- PDB: IPR001561 PF00598 (ECOD; PDBsum)
- AlphaFold: IPR001561; PF00598

The M1 protein is a matrix protein of the influenza virus. It forms a coat inside the viral envelope. This is a bifunctional membrane/RNA-binding protein that mediates the encapsidation of nucleoprotein cores into the membrane envelope. It is therefore required that M1 binds both membrane and RNA simultaneously.

The M1 protein binds to the viral RNA. The binding is not specific to any RNA sequence, and is performed via a peptide sequence rich in basic amino acids.

It also has multiple regulatory functions, performed by interaction with the components of the host cell. The mechanisms regulated include a role in the export of the viral ribonucleoproteins from the host cell nucleus, inhibition of viral transcription, and a role in the virus assembly and budding. The protein was found to undergo phosphorylation in the host cell.

The M1 protein forms a layer under the patches of host cell membrane that are rich with the viral hemagglutinin, neuraminidase and M2 transmembrane proteins, and facilitates budding of the mature viruses.

M1 consists of two domains connected by a linker sequence. The N-terminal domain has a multi-helical structure that can be divided into two subdomains. The C-terminal domain also contains alpha-helical structure.

== See also ==
- H5N1 genetic structure
