= Goose Guangdong virus =

Virus classification
- (unranked): Virus
- Realm: Riboviria
- Kingdom: Orthornavirae
- Phylum: Negarnaviricota
- Class: Insthoviricetes
- Order: Articulavirales
- Family: Orthomyxoviridae
- Genus: Alphainfluenzavirus
- Species: Influenza A virus
- Strain: Goose Guangdong virus

Strain of H5N1 influenza virus

The Goose Guangdong virus refers to the strain A/Goose/Guangdong/1/96 (Gs/Gd)-like H5N1 HPAI viruses. It is a strain of the Influenzavirus A subtype H5N1 virus that was first detected in a goose in Guangdong in 1996. It is an HPAI (High Pathogenic Avian Influenza) virus, meaning that it can kill a very high percentage of chickens in a flock in mere days. It is believed to be the immediate precursor of the current dominant strain of HPAI A(H5N1) that evolved from 1999 to 2002 creating the Z genotype (also called "Asian lineage HPAI A(H5N1)") that is spreading globally and is epizootic (an epidemic in nonhumans) and panzootic (affecting animals of many species, especially over a wide area), killing tens of millions of birds and spurring the culling of hundreds of millions of others to stem its spread.

The conversion to the Z genotype probably occurred by reassortment with an Eurasian teal (duck) virus H6N1 during a mixed influenza infection:

"An H6N1 virus isolated from teal (A/teal/Hong Kong/W312/97 [H6N1]) showed very high (>98%) nucleotide homology to the human influenza virus A/Hong Kong/156/97 (H5N1) in the six internal genes. The N1 neuraminidase sequence showed 97% nucleotide homology to that of the human H5N1 virus, and the N1 protein of both viruses had the same 19-amino-acid deletion in the stalk region. The deduced hemagglutinin amino acid sequence of the H6N1 virus was most similar to that of A/shearwater/Australia/1/72 (H6N5). The H6N1 virus is the first known isolate with seven H5N1-like segments and may have been the donor of the neuraminidase and the internal genes of the H5N1 viruses. The high homology between the internal genes of H9N2, H6N1, and the H5N1 isolates indicates that these subtypes are able to exchange their internal genes and are therefore a potential source of new pathogenic influenza virus strains."

== See also ==
- Fujian flu
