= NS1 influenza protein =

Protein family

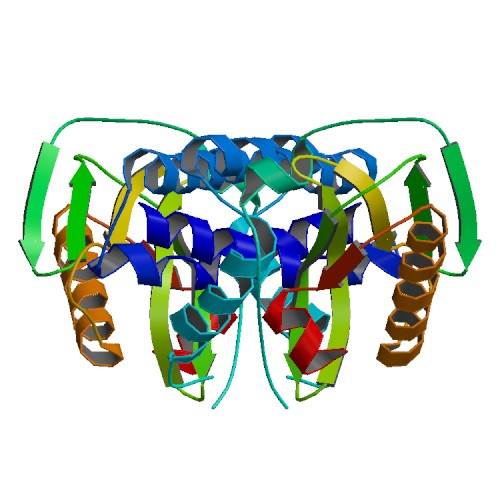
Dimer of the Influenzavirus A non-structural protein 1 from A/Vietnam/1203/2004(H5N1)

The NS1 influenza protein (NS1) is a viral nonstructural protein encoded by the NS gene segments of type A, B and C influenza viruses. Also encoded by this segment is the nuclear export protein (NEP), formerly referred to as NS2 protein, which mediates the export of influenza virus ribonucleoprotein (RNP) complexes from the nucleus into the cytoplasm, where they are assembled.

== Characteristics ==
The NS1 of influenza A virus is a 26,000 Dalton protein. It prevents polyadenylation of cellular mRNAs to circumvent antiviral responses of the host, e.g., maturation and translation of interferon mRNAs. NS1 might also inhibit splicing of pre-mRNA by binding to a stem-bulge region in U6 small nuclear RNA (snRNA). In addition, NS1 is probably able to suppress the interferon response in the virus-infected cell leading to unimpaired virus production.

NS1 also binds dsRNA. Binding assays with NS1 protein mutants established that the RNA-binding domain of the NS1 protein is required for binding to dsRNA as well as for binding to polyA and U6 snRNA. In addition, dsRNA competed with U6 snRNA for binding to the NS1 protein, a result consistent with both RNAs sharing the same binding site on the protein. As a consequence of its binding to dsRNA, the NS1 protein blocks the activation of the dsRNA-activated protein kinase (PKR) in vitro. This kinase phosphorylates the alpha subunit of eukaryotic translation initiation factor 2 (elF-2 alpha), leading to a decrease in the rate of initiation of translation. In the absence of NS1, this pathway is inhibited during anti-viral response to halt all protein translation – thus stopping the synthesis of viral proteins; however, the influenza virus' NS1 protein is an agent that circumvents host defenses to allows viral gene transcription to occur.

The NS1 protein can be divided into an N terminal (RNA binding) domain and C terminal (effector domain). The RNA binding domain is able to target RIG-I, and therefore prevent the activation of induction of interferon responses. At the effector domain, it interacts and inhibits cleavage and polyadenylation specificity factor (CPSF30). CPSF30 is part of processing pathway for cellular mRNAs, and its inhibition leads to inability of the cellular mRNA to be exported outside the nucleus for translation, thereby hindering the ability of host cell to produce Interferon-stimulated genes.

== Avian ==
The NS1 protein of the highly pathogenic avian H5N1 viruses circulating in poultry and waterfowl in Southeast Asia is currently believed to be responsible for the enhanced virulence of the strain. H5N1 NS1 is characterized by a single amino acid change at position 92. By changing the amino acid from glutamic acid to aspartic acid, researchers were able to annul the effect of the H5N1 NS1. This single amino acid change in the NS1 gene greatly increased the pathogenicity of the H5N1 influenza virus. However, the effect of residue 92 on the function of H5N1 NS1 appears to be questionable as noted by Nature Medicine editors:

The above paper originally reported that H5N1 viruses are resistant to interferon in the SJPL cell line. The editors wish to alert our readers about three facts that may affect this conclusion. First, Ngunjiri et al. have recently found that aliquots of the SJPL cell line obtained from the American Type Culture Collection were heavily contaminated with mycoplasma. Although the mycoplasma status of the cells used in the original paper is unknown, it is not possible to rule out that they were contaminated. Second, SJPL cells were originally reported to be of porcine origin, but a recent analysis has indicated that they are of simian origin. Third, Ngunjiri et al. have found H5N1 viruses to be sensitive to interferons in all cell lines tested from multiple species.

== Pathogenicity ==
The fact that NS1 is involved in the pathogenicity of influenza A viruses makes it a good target to attenuate these viruses. Several studies demonstrated that influenza viruses with partial deletions in NS1 proteins are attenuated and do not cause disease, but induce a protective immune response in different species including mice, pigs, horses, birds and macaques. Although it had been known for more than a decade that influenza viruses with partial deletions in NS1 proteins were attenuated, all but one NS1 truncation variants of influenza A viruses were generated by in vitro mutagenesis. Wang et al. later demonstrated that the naturally truncated variant had propensity to generate new variants when passaged in ovo. Remarkably, the new variants were excellent live-attenuated influenza vaccine candidates. The ability to attenuate influenza viruses by truncation of the NS1 protein presents a novel approach in design and development of the next generation live-attenuated influenza vaccines for both poultry and humans.

== See also ==
- H5N1 genetic structure
