= PB2 E627K mutation =

The PB2 E627K mutation in the viral polymerase of H5N1 (colloquially known as bird flu) allows for interaction with the mammalian gene ANP32A for optimal viral replication. Such host switching can be of grave public health concern. It was first noted in the scientific literature in February 2014, and emerged in the then-novel highly pathogenic avian influenza A(H5N1) clade in 2020. Host adaptation has been noted as being "rapid"; the most recent outbreak was posited to be in San Bernardino County, California dairy cow herds in March 2025.
