= Viral tegument =

Feature of viruses

Location of the viral tegument

A viral tegument or tegument, more commonly known as a viral matrix, is a cluster of proteins that lines the space between the envelope and nucleocapsid of all herpesviruses. The tegument generally contains proteins that aid in viral DNA replication and evasion of the immune response, typically with inhibition of signalling in the immune system and activation of interferons. The tegument is usually released shortly after infection into the cytoplasm. These proteins are usually formed within the late phase of the viral infectious cycle, after viral genes have been replicated. Much information regarding viral teguments has been gathered from studying herpes simplex virus.

== Properties of teguments ==
Viral teguments can be symmetrically arranged via structural and scaffolding protein or can also be asymmetrically arranged, depending on the virus. Teguments are rarely haphazardly placed and usually involve scaffolding proteins in their formation around the nucleocapsid. Non-essential proteins included in the tegument may aid in immune response suppression, suppression of host mRNA transcription or suppression of intrinsic or cellular defenses. Essential proteins will include factors that help in trafficking of the viral capsid to the nucleus (for herpesviruses), recruiting host transcription or translation factors, or directly transcribing or translating viral genes. Tegumental contents are released into the cytoplasm upon entrance into the cell upon which many tegumental proteins become active. The tegument may also aid in insertion of the viral genome into host cell cytoplasm or nucleus.
