= M2 proton channel =

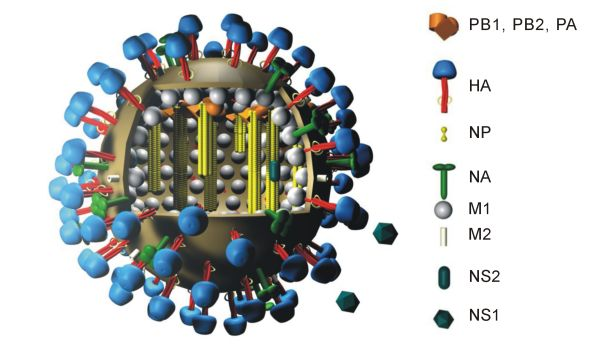
3D model of the flu virion. (M2 labeled in white.)

The Matrix-2 (M2) protein is a proton-selective viroporin, integral in the viral envelope of the influenza A virus. The channel itself is a homotetramer (consists of four identical M2 units), where the units are helices stabilized by two disulfide bonds, and is activated by low pH. The M2 protein is encoded on the seventh RNA segment together with the M1 protein. Proton conductance by the M2 protein in influenza A is essential for viral replication.

Influenza B and C viruses encode proteins with similar function dubbed "BM2" and "CM2" respectively. They share little similarity with M2 at the sequence level, despite a similar overall structure and mechanism.

== Structure ==
Flu_M2
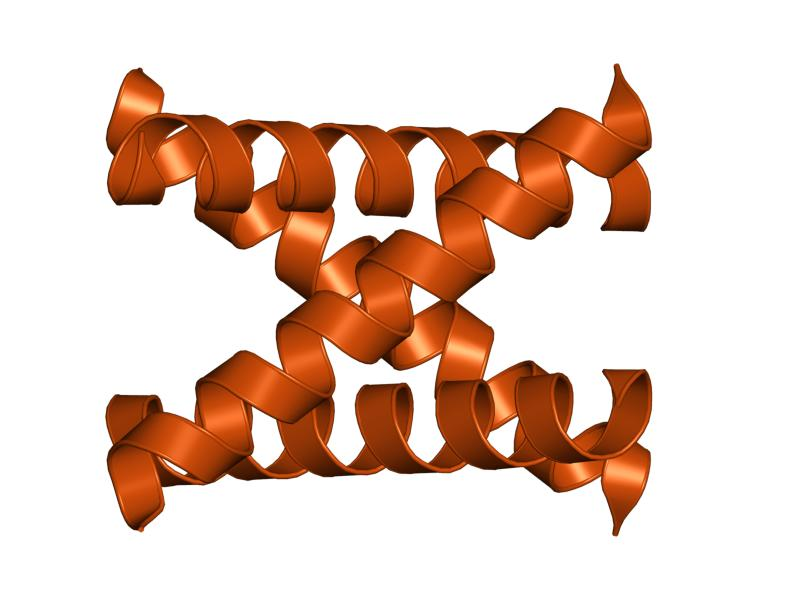
- the closed state structure of m2 protein h+ channel by solid state nmr spectroscopy

Identifiers
- Symbol: Flu_M2
- Pfam: PF00599
- InterPro: IPR002089
- SCOP2: 1mp6 / SCOPe / SUPFAM
- TCDB: 1.A.19
- OPM superfamily: 185
- OPM protein: 2kqt
Available protein structures:
- PDB: IPR002089 PF00599 (ECOD; PDBsum)
- AlphaFold: IPR002089; PF00599

In influenza A virus, M2 protein unit consists of three protein segments comprising 97 amino acid residues: (i) an extracellular N-terminal domain (residues 1–23); (ii) a transmembrane segment (TMS) (residues 24–46); (iii) an intracellular C-terminal domain (residues 47–97). The TMS forms the pore of the ion channel. The important residues are the imidazole of His37 (pH sensor) and the indole of Trp41 (gate). This domain is the target of the anti influenza drugs, amantadine and its ethyl derivative rimantadine, and probably also the methyl derivative of rimantadine, adapromine. The first 17 residues of the M2 cytoplasmic tail form a highly conserved amphipathic helix.

The amphipathic helix residues (46–62) within the cytoplasmic tail play role in virus budding and assembly. The influenza virus utilizes these amphipathic helices in M2 to alter membrane curvature at the budding neck of the virus in a cholesterol dependent manner. The residues 70–77 of cytoplasmic tail are important for binding to M1 and for the efficient production of infectious virus particles. This region also contains a caveolin binding domain (CBD). The C-terminal end of the channel extends into a loop (residues 47–50) that connects the trans membrane domain to the C-terminal amphipathic helix. (46–62). Two different high-resolution structures of truncated forms of M2 have been reported: the crystal structure of a mutated form of the M2 transmembrane region (residues 22–46), as well as a longer version of the protein (residues 18–60) containing the transmembrane region and a segment of the C-terminal domain as studied by nuclear magnetic resonance (NMR).

The two structures also suggest different binding sites for the adamantane class of anti-influenza drugs. According to the low pH crystal structure a single molecule of amantadine binds in the middle of the pore, surrounded by residues Val27, Ala30, Ser31 and Gly34. In contrast, the NMR structure showed four rimantadine molecules bind to the lipid facing outer surface of the pore, interacting with residues Asp44 and Arg45. However, a recent solid state NMR spectroscopy structure shows that the M2 channel has two binding sites for amantadine, one high affinity site is in the N terminal lumen, and a second low affinity site on the C terminal protein surface.

== Proton conductance and selectivity ==
The M2 ion channel of both influenza A is highly selective for protons. The channel is activated by low pH and has a low conductance. Histidine residues at position 37 (His37) are responsible for this proton selectivity and pH modulation. When His37 is replaced with glycine, alanine, glutamic acid, serine or threonine, the proton selective activity is lost and the mutant can transport Na^{+} and K^{+} ions also. When imidazole buffer is added to cells expressing mutant proteins, the ion selectivity is partially rescued.

Acharya et al. suggested that the conduction mechanism involves the exchange of protons between the His37 imidazole moieties of M2 and waters confined to the M2 bundle interior. Water molecules within the pore form hydrogen-bonded networks or 'water wires' from the channel entrance to His37. Pore-lining carbonyl groups are well situated to stabilize hydronium ions via second-shell interactions involving bridging water molecules. A collective switch of hydrogen bond orientations may contribute to the directionality of proton flux as His37 is dynamically protonated and deprotonated in the conduction cycle. The His37 residues form a box-like structure, bounded on either side by water clusters with well-ordered oxygen atoms near by. The conformation of the protein, which is intermediate between structures previously solved at higher and lower pH, suggests a mechanism by which conformational changes might facilitate asymmetric diffusion through the channel in the presence of a proton gradient. Moreover, protons diffusing through the channel need not be localized to a single His37 imidazole, but instead may be delocalized over the entire His-box and associated water clusters.

== Function ==
The M2 channel protein is an essential component of the viral envelope because of its ability to form a highly selective, pH-regulated, proton-conducting channel. The M2 proton channel maintains pH across the viral envelope during cell entry and across the trans-Golgi membrane of infected cells during viral maturation. As virus enters the host cell by receptor-mediated endocytosis, endosomal acidification occurs. This low pH activates the M2 channel, which brings protons into the virion core. Acidification of virus interior leads to weakening of electrostatic interaction and leads to dissociation between M1 and viral ribonucleoprotein (RNP) complexes. Subsequent membrane fusion releases the uncoated RNPs into the cytoplasm which is imported to the nucleus to start viral replication.

After its synthesis within the infected host cell, M2 is inserted into the endoplasmic reticulum (ER) and transported to the cell surface via trans-Golgi network (TGN). Within the acidic TGN, M2 transports H^{+} ions out of the lumen, and maintains hemagglutinin (HA) metastable configuration. At its TGN localization, M2 protein's ion channel activity has been shown to effectively activate the NLRP3 inflammasome pathway.

Other important functions of M2 are its role in formation of filamentous strains of influenza, membrane scission and the release of the budding virion. M2 stabilizes the virus budding site, and mutations of M2 that prevent its binding to M1 can impair filament formation at the site of budding.

=== Transport reaction ===
The generalized transport reaction catalyzed by the M2 channel is:

H^{+} (out) ⇌ H^{+} (in)

== Inhibition and resistance ==
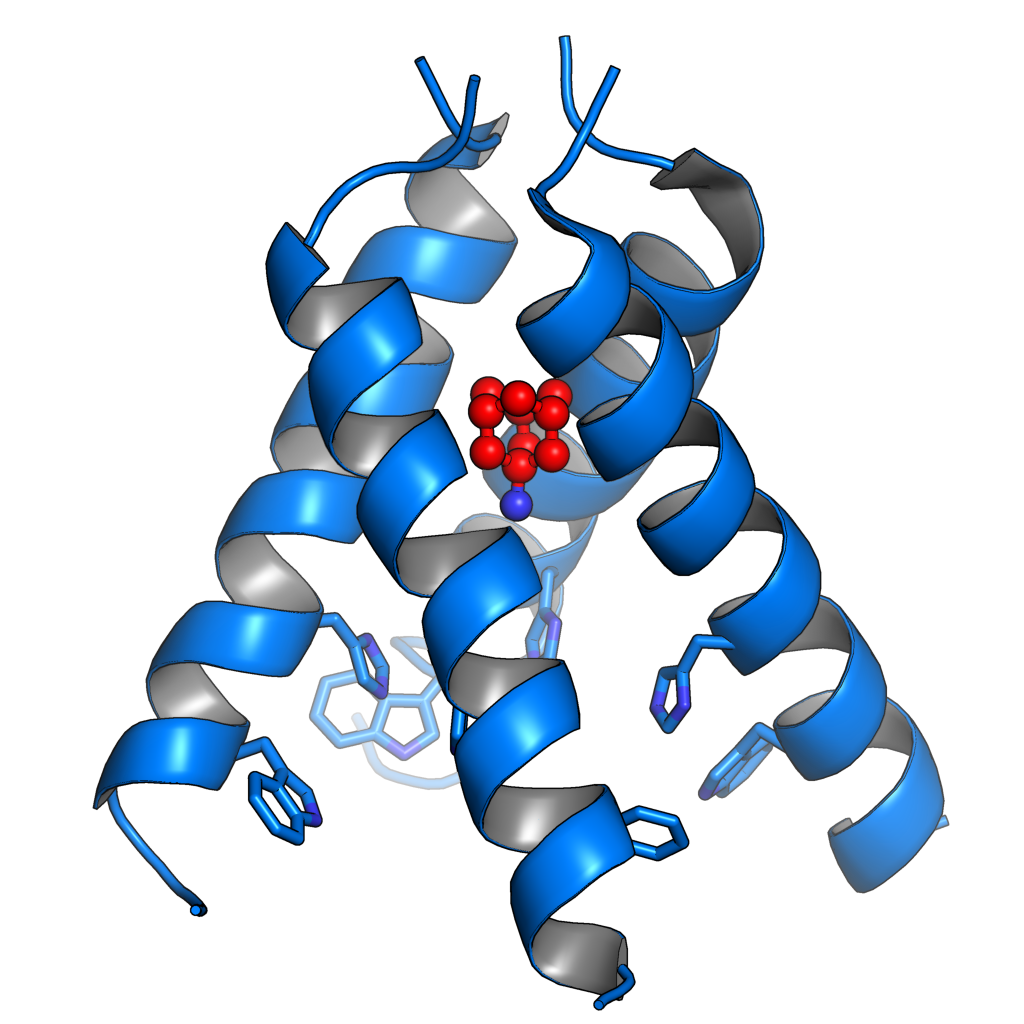
The transmembrane helical tetramer of the influenza A virus M2 protein in complex with the channel-blocking drug amantadine (shown in red). Highly conserved tryptophan and histidine residues known to play key roles in mediating proton transport are shown as sticks. From PDB: 3C9J.

The anti-influenza virus drug, amantadine, is a specific blocker of the M2 H^{+} channel. The drug binds in and occludes the central pore. In the presence of amantadine, viral uncoating and disassembly is incomplete. Mutations conferring resistance to adamantane drugs, including amantadine and rimantadine, occur in the transmembrane region and are widespread. The large majority of resistant viruses carry the S31N mutation. Resistance to adamantanes among circulating influenza A viruses varies by region but has globally increased significantly since the early 2000s. The US CDC has released information stating that most circulating strains are now resistant to the two drugs available, and as of June 2021, their use is not recommended.

== Influenza B and C M2 proteins ==
M2 proton channel

Identifiers
- Symbol: Flu_B_M2
- Pfam: PF04772
- InterPro: IPR006859
Available protein structures:
- PDB: PDB: 2KJ1 IPR006859 PF04772 (ECOD; PDBsum)
- AlphaFold: IPR006859; PF04772

CM2

Identifiers
- Symbol: CM2
- Pfam: PF03021
- InterPro: IPR004267
Available protein structures:
- PDB: IPR004267 PF03021 (ECOD; PDBsum)
- AlphaFold: IPR004267; PF03021

Influenza B and C viruses encode virion proteins with similar proton-transducing function dubbed "BM2" and "CM2" respectively. They share little similarity with M2 at the sequence level, despite a similar overall structure and mechanism.

=== BM2 ===
The M2 protein of influenza B is 109 residue long, homo-tetramer and is a functional homolog of influenza A protein. There is almost no sequence homology between influenza AM2 and BM2 except for the HXXXW sequence motif in the TMS that is essential for channel function. Its proton conductance pH profile is similar to that of AM2. However, the BM2 channel activity is higher than that of AM2, and the BM2 activity is completely insensitive to amantadine and rimantadine. The structure of the influenza B channel at resolutions of 1.4–1.5 Å, published in 2020, revealed that the channel opening mechanism is different from that of the influenza A channel.

=== CM2 ===
CM2 may play a role in genome packaging in virions. CM2 adjusts intracellular pH, and is able to replace influenza A M2 in this capacity.

== See also ==
- H5N1 genetic structure
