= Influenza virus nucleoprotein =

Structural protein which encapsidates viral RNA

Influenza virus nucleoprotein (NP)

Identifiers
- Symbol: Flu_NP
- Pfam: PF00506
- InterPro: IPR002141
Available protein structures:
- PDB: IPR002141 PF00506 (ECOD; PDBsum)
- AlphaFold: IPR002141; PF00506

Influenza virus nucleoprotein (NP) is a structural protein which encapsidates the negative strand viral RNA. NP is one of the main determinants of species specificity. The question of how far the NP gene can cross the species barrier by reassortment and become adapted by mutation to the new host has been discussed.

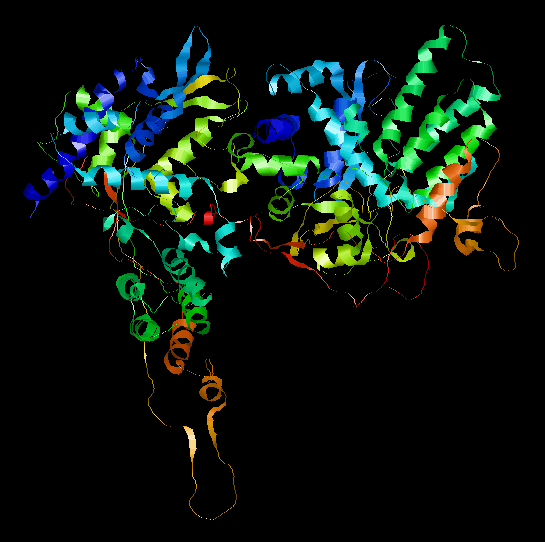
