= Viral matrix protein =

Viral matrix protein (Paramyxoviridae and Pneumoviridae)

Identifiers
- Symbol: Matrix
- Pfam: PF00661
- InterPro: IPR000982
Available protein structures:
- PDB: IPR000982 PF00661 (ECOD; PDBsum)
- AlphaFold: IPR000982; PF00661

Viral matrix proteins are structural proteins linking the viral envelope with the virus core. They play a crucial role in virus assembly, and interact with the RNP complex as well as with the viral membrane. They are found in many enveloped viruses including paramyxoviruses, orthomyxoviruses, herpesviruses, retroviruses, filoviruses and other groups.

An example is the M1 protein of the influenza virus, showing affinity to the glycoproteins inserted in the host cell membrane on one side and affinity for the RNP complex molecules on the other side, which allows formation at the membrane of a complex made of the viral ribonucleoprotein at the inner side indirectly connected to the viral glycoproteins protruding from the membrane. This assembly complex will now bud out of the cell as new mature viruses.

Viral matrix proteins, like many other viral proteins, can exert different functions during the course of the infection. For example, in rhabdoviruses, binding of M proteins to nucleocapsids is accountable for the formation of its “bullet” shaped virions.

In herpesviruses, the viral matrix is usually called viral tegument and contains many proteins involved in viral entry, early gene expression and immune evasion.

== See also ==
- Retroviral matrix protein
- Viral tegument
