= Influenza A virus subtype H6N1 =

Virus classification
- (unranked): Virus
- Realm: Riboviria
- Kingdom: Orthornavirae
- Phylum: Negarnaviricota
- Class: Insthoviricetes
- Order: Articulavirales
- Family: Orthomyxoviridae
- Genus: Alphainfluenzavirus
- Species: Influenza A virus
- Serotype: Influenza A virus subtype H6N1

Subtype of Influenza A

Influenza A virus subtype H6N1 (A/H6N1), is a subtype of the influenza A virus. It has only infected one person, a woman in Taiwan, who recovered. Known to infect Eurasian teal, it is closely related to subtype H5N1.
