= Type A influenza vaccine =

Vaccine against Type A influenza

Type A influenza vaccine is for the prevention of infection of influenza A virus and also the influenza-related complications. Different monovalent type A influenza vaccines have been developed for different subtypes of influenza A virus including H1N1 and H5N1. Both intramuscular injection or intranasal spray are available on market. Unlike the seasonal influenza vaccines which are used annually, they are usually used during the outbreak of certain strand of subtypes of influenza A. Common adverse effects includes injection site reaction and local tenderness. Incidences of headache and myalgia were also reported with H1N1 whereas cases of fever has also been demonstrated with H5N1 vaccines. It is stated that immunosuppressant therapies would reduce the therapeutic effects of vaccines and that people with egg allergy should go for the egg-free preparations.

There are different methods in developing the vaccines. Traditionally, inactivated viral vaccine and live attenuated virus vaccine have been approved. Inactivated viral vaccine is primary used parentally and the live attenuated vaccine is used intranasally. Development of new technologies including the recombinant hemagglutinin technology have widely been studied.

Influenza A virus was successfully identified and isolated by Wilson Smith, Christopher Andrewes, and Patrick Laidlaw in the 1930s and the first inactivated monovalent influenza A vaccine was made after a decade. The first H5N1 vaccine was approved in 2007. It was intentionally developed to prepare for the possible H5N1 outbreak in the future. Moreover, in view of the H1N1 outbreak in 2009, H1N1 monovalent vaccines, targeting only H1N1 virus, was produced.

Influenza A exists in many subtypes including H5N1, H1N1 and H3N2. Different formulations of monovalent vaccines have been developed over the years to cater different needs and antigens identified.

== Medical use ==
Influenza vaccines are generally used for preventing influenza illness and influenza-related complications. Different from the trivalent and quadrivalent seasonal influenza vaccine which prevent against three or four subtypes of viruses, monovalent influenza vaccine works against a specific subtype of influenza A virus.

H5N1 monovalent intramuscular vaccine working against H5N1 virus has been developed and it was proved to be having satisfactory performance in its response in neutralising the virus strain using antibodies. Although there is no incidence of aerosol transmission of H5N1 virus from human to human and causing a pandemic, this vaccine is predicted to be used for the future when H5N1 vaccine gains its ability to transmit efficiently across human. Booster doses are required for the H5N1 vaccine.

There was an outbreak of H1N1 virus across the globe in 2009. Specific vaccines were developed to produce immunity in human towards the novel H1N1 virus. It can be given intramuscular or intranasal depending on the preparations from different manufacturers. The U.S. Food and Drug Administration (FDA) approved the use of 4 injectable H1N1 monovalent vaccines and 1 intranasal H1N1 monovalent vaccine. One or two doses of vaccine may be taken depending on the recipients' age.

=== Recommendation ===
Monovalent type A influenza vaccines are generally indicated during the pandemic or the flu for everyone without contraindications. According to the Advisory Committee on Immunization Practices (ACIP) under the Centre for Disease Control and Prevention (CDC), people aged above 10 are recommended to take one dose of H1N1 vaccine while those who are 6 months to 9 years old should be injected twice. Pregnant women, healthcare workers or care givers of infants younger than 6months are highly recommended to get inoculated. On the other hand, the H5N1 vaccines developed are not commercially available and will be distributed if required in case of H5N1 pandemic. It is indicated for adults aged 18 to 64 years old who are having high risk of exposure to H5N1 virus according to the FDA.

== Adverse effects ==
Some general adverse effects for the injectable vaccine includes injection site redness, pain and local tenderness. People receiving injectable H1N1 vaccines may also experience headache and myalgia. Meanwhile, the common adverse effects for intranasal H1N1 vaccine for adults includes sore throat, runny nose and coughing. On the other hand, 11 out of 118 recipients of H5N1 vaccine in a clinical trial was reported to develop fever after receiving the doses. Incidences of malaise, myalgia or nausea were not shown to differ significantly with the placebo group.

Cases of narcolepsy were also reported in many regions, often after carrying out their H1N1 influenza vaccination campaign, in 2009–2010. These incidences were mostly associated with the H1N1 vaccine, Pandemrix®. Despite the serious consequence, the chance of developing narcolepsy remains low and that the benefits of acquiring immunization from vaccine outweigh the risk of developing narcolepsy.

There was also report on rash developed after H5N1 vaccine injection. Nonpruritic and maculopapular rash was developed over the abdomen and upper arms a few days after the injection.

== Cautions ==
Egg allergy individuals should avoid injection of egg-based H1N1 or H5N1 vaccine as the antigen strand inside the vaccine is grown from the cell culture of chicken embryo. They should be offered with egg-free vaccines according to the Department of Health from the UK.

Immunosuppressant therapies may reduce immune response of the H1N1 monovalent vaccine. Therapies including antimetabolites, irradiation and cytotoxic drugs should be avoided in time of vaccination.

== Technologies in type A influenza vaccine ==
The inactivated vaccine and the live attenuated virus vaccine are the two major types of vaccines authorised currently. The inactivated vaccine includes a strand of killed pathogen inside the vaccine while a weakened form of virus is included inside the live attenuated vaccine. They both aim to trigger the active immune response inside our body. The inactivated viral vaccine is injected parentally. Meanwhile, the live attenuated virus vaccine usually comes in trivalent or quadrivalent forms for intranasal administration. However, there is insufficient data from the 2013-2016 flu seasons showing the effectiveness of quadrivalent live attenuated vaccine in children aged 2–17. Primarily, inactivated viral vaccines are used as prevention of influenza in the United States.

When producing the strand of weakened or killed virus, egg-based or cell-based technology can be applied. For the egg-based technology, the flu virus is grown inside an egg. On the other hand, the flu virus strand for cell-based vaccine is grown using cultured cell of mammalian origins.

As there are insufficient supply of H1N1 vaccine dutring the 2009 pandemic, new technologies, not restricted by the egg-based or cell-based, are tested. In addition to the existing technologies, recombinant hemagglutinin (rHA)-based vaccine was developed newly for influenza vaccine production. Hemagglutinin (HA) is the dominant target for antibodies to neutralise influenza virus after natural infection or vaccine. rHA stimulate H1N1 surface protein and allow body to produce antibodies against it. rHA vaccine does not contain egg protein, or any other extraneous influenza virus proteins other than HA. This is an advantage for people who cannot tolerate egg or the other materials included in the conventional vaccine. Ongoing research is required to produce vaccine that can stimulate production of immune response that neutralise a board spectrum of influenza subtypes.

== History ==
=== Origin and development ===
Type A influenza was isolated from humans and identifies as a virus in the 1930s by Wilson Smith, Christopher Andrewes, and Patrick Laidlaw. However, the corresponding vaccines were not developed until the 1940s when Thomas Francis Jr., MD and Jonas Salk, MD in the University of Michigan started to develop the first influenza vaccine with the support from the US army. The first flu vaccine developed was egg-based. It only includes inactivated influenza A virus.

Another influenza vaccine was put into market in 1942. It is a bivalent vaccine that offers protection to influenza A and B viruses. Furthermore, the cell culture technology was developed which allows virus growing outside the body for the first time. The culturing of virus cell from the respiratory secretion also allows accurate diagnosis of the influenza.

Despite all the vaccine development in the 1930s and early 1940s, the influenza vaccine was not indicated for civilian use in the US until 1945. Before 1945, the influenza vaccine was only for military use as the army lost a great troop from flu and illness during World War. It was not until 1945 that the vaccine acquired sufficient evidence for its use in humans.

=== Discovery of evolution of virus ===
In 1947, scientists discovered the ineffectiveness of the existing vaccine towards the seasonal flu virus. It was further determined that the virus's antigen composition changes from time to time and it highlights the importance of continuous surveillance, characterization of the novel circulating strand of virus and also the continuous modification of the vaccines.

=== Surveillance of virus subtypes ===
The World Health Organization (WHO) Influenza Centre was set up in 1948 in London to collect and characterize influenza virus, develop methods for diagnosis, and assist in the continuous investigation on the evolution of virus.

To better monitor the evolution of virus, The Global Influenza Surveillance and Response System (GISRS) was established by the WHO influenza centre in 1952, aiming to create a global platform to share data about virus, prepare and monitor seasonal evolution of virus or pathogenesis, ease the development and research of type A influenza vaccine.

=== Modern vaccines development ===
==== H5N1 ====
In April 2007, the FDA approved the first vaccine for H5N1 from Sanofi Pasteur. The vaccine was made based on the isolated virus sample from a Vietnamese patient in 2004. Nowadays, there are many different H5N1 vaccine available from different pharmaceutical companies across the globe such as vaccines from Novartis, GSK or Baxter.

==== H1N1 ====
In April 2009, there was the first case of human infection of H1N1 reported in California. This marks the beginning of the H1N1 pandemic in 2009 worldwide. In late April 2009, CDC successfully identified the sequence of the H1N1 gene and it was uploaded onto a database accessible to all members of the public. In September, the first vaccine for H1N1 was approved by the FDA and the 2009 H1N1 vaccination campaign was held in the US after a month to encourage all the vulnerable groups such as patients with chronic illness, pregnant women or healthcare providers to get vaccinated.

In 2012, the technology using cell-cultured virus to manufacture vaccines was adopted as an alternative to egg-based influenza A vaccine. In the same year, WHO started to recommend the use of the annual quadrivalent vaccine. (a vaccine which can produce 4 different antigens: 2 type A influenza H1N1 and H3N2 and 2 type B influenza antigens)

== Different subtypes of vaccines ==
Subtypes of influenza A vaccine are classified based on the influenza A virus subtype. Influenza A virus is classified according to the surface proteins: hemagglutinin (H) and neuraminidase (N). There are 18 and 11 subtypes of hemagglutinin and neuraminidase respectively which allow variations of the virus surface protein, leading to different subtypes. Therefore, vaccines developed by different manufacturer may contain antigen of different subtype of virus of different DNA sequences. The forms in which their antigens are present, whether they are in inactivated or live attenuated, may also be different. Below are the examples of the subtypes of influenza A and their corresponding vaccines developed.

=== Nomenclature of reference DNA strands ===
A universal naming system was created to ease communication across the globe by the World Health Organisation (WHO) in 1980. It starts with the type of virus, followed by the region where it is identified, the virus strain number, the year of isolation or identification and lastly the subtype of the virus.

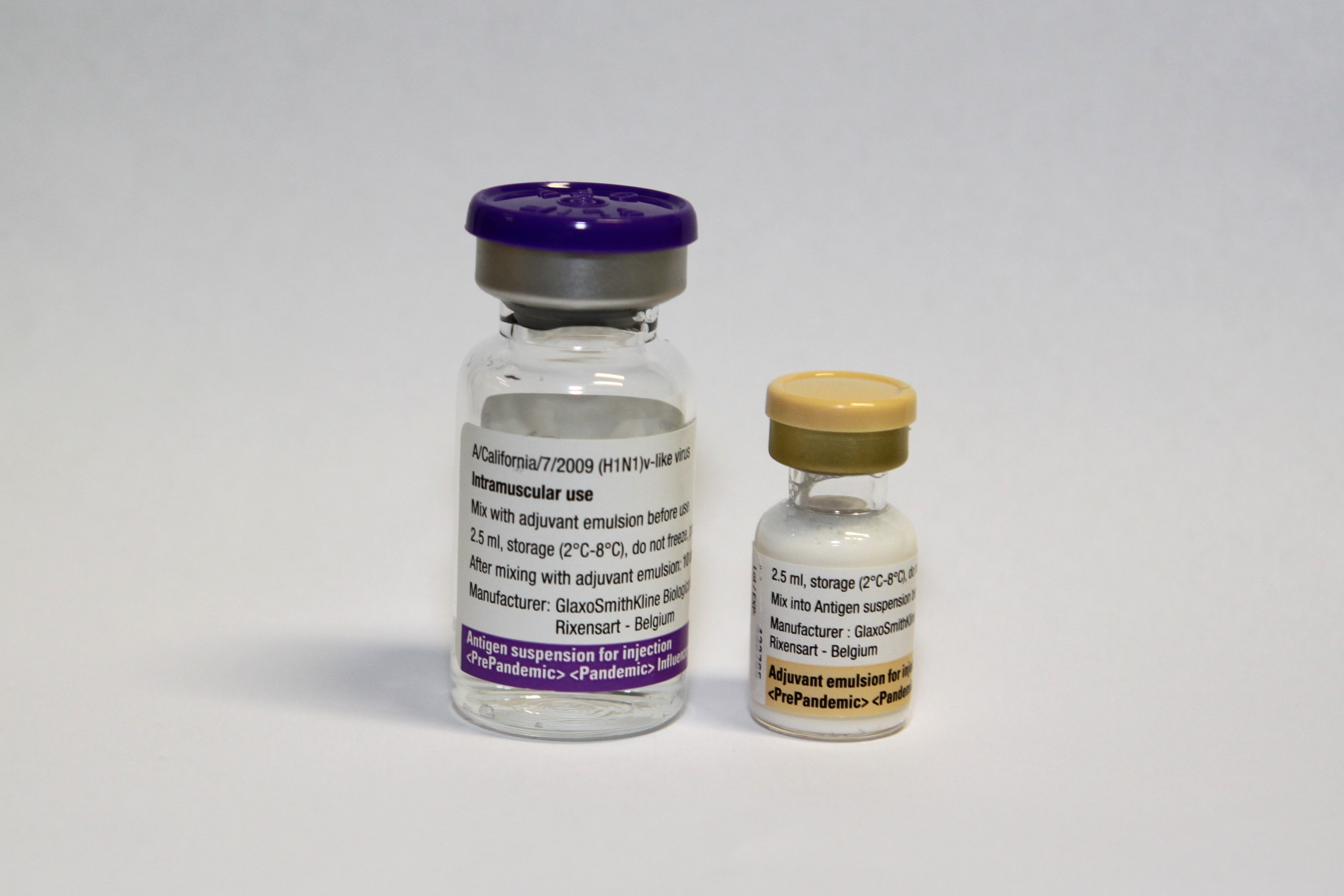
Influenza A v-like virus/California/07/2009 (H1N1)

H and N subtypes	Reference DNA Strains
H5N1	A/chick/Scotland/59 (H5N1)
H1N1	Influenza A v-like virus/California/07/2009 (H1N1); A/swine/lowa/15/30(H1N1)
H3N2	A/swine/Taiwan/1/70 (H3N2); A/turkey/England/69 (H3N2)
