= 2009 swine flu pandemic in Norway =

Counties with confirmed case counts in Norway as of 26 October 2009. Seven counties had 5-49 cases, 12 had 50-499 cases. No county had 500+ cases. Note that confirmed case counts are likely gross underestimations of actual flu cases. 500+ cases 50+ cases 5+ cases 1+ cases Deaths

The 2009–2010 flu pandemic in Norway marked the initial phase of a new influenza pandemic. This pandemic began in the spring of 2009, the illness appeared in tourists returning from affected areas. By the summer of 2009, local person-to-person transmission within Norway was established. Soon thereafter, the number of patients being tested for swine flu exceeded capacity, and authorities recommended that only patients with severe symptoms be tested. The first Norwegian death from swine flu was reported in early September 2009.

Norway was notable among the Scandinavian countries for a high number of swine flu deaths—29 deaths as of 4 January 2010. All 19 counties of Norway had confirmed cases, and deaths occurred in five of the counties. Only Svalbard (an archipelago midway between Norway and the North Pole) had no reported cases of swine flu. About 10 million doses of flu vaccine were ordered from the pharmaceutical industry when the World Health Organization declared a pandemic. The first vaccination campaign started in Bergen, on 22 October 2009, with several hundred people queuing up. The flu was given widespread media coverage and the Norwegian government published a tally of laboratory-confirmed cases of swine flu, but made clear that this was an underestimation.

== Timeline overview ==
On 25 April 2009, the Norwegian Institute for Public Health increased their level of alert after reports of a severe influenza in Mexico. Three days later, it was considered "highly likely" that the new flu would reach Norway within the next few weeks. The first confirmed Norwegian cases appeared on 9 May 2009, in tourists returning from affected areas. By the summer of 2009, local spread of the influenza was established.

On 9 May 2009, the first confirmed cases were reported in two students from Oslo and Telemark returning from trips abroad. As of early July 2009, there were 42 confirmed cases of swine flu, of which 39 of the people were infected while abroad. In late July 2009, a local outbreak was reported in a summer camp in Western Norway. The number of patients wanting tests for the suspected new flu soon exceeded the capacity to test, and by late July 2009, Norwegian authorities were recommending that only severe and special cases be tested.

== Influenza surveillance ==
The Norwegian government has operated an influenza surveillance system for many years. In this system, 201 selected general practices throughout the country report weekly the percentage of patients given a diagnosis of influenza. The study covers about 15% of the population. The results of the influenza study during the 2009 flu pandemic in Norway are shown in the figure below. The share of doctor contacts that ended in a diagnosis of influenza-like illness shot up to nearly 10% in week 44. The last time this percentage was this high was in the 1999-2000 flu season.

On the basis of the last reported data, as of 4 November 2009, the Norwegian Public Health Institute concluded "the pandemic influenza virus is spreading epidemically in large parts of the country".

A time series of the percentage of doctor contacts resulting in a diagnosis of influenza-like illness in the Norwegian influenza surveillance system, from early May to October 2009

== Deaths ==
Death number	Date	Age	Gender	County	Comment	Reference
0	23 July	48	Male	Not relevant	Spanish, dead on cruise ship
1	25 August	Middle aged	Male	Not relevant	Danish truck driver
2	September	42	Female	Akershus
3	7 September	17	Female	Vestfold
4	16 September	70-79	Male	Telemark
5	2 October	27	Male	Oppland
6	4 October	30-39	Female	Oslo	Pregnant
7	17 October	50-59	Male	Hordaland
8	20 October	20-29	Female	Akershus
9	22 October	50-59	Female	Akershus
10	23 October	2	Male	Vest-Agder
11	26 October	9	Female	Oslo
12	28 October	20-29	Male	Oppland
13	28 October	30-39	Female	Oslo
14	29 October	60-69	Female	Hedmark
15	1 November	16	Female	Hedmark

== Scenarios ==
It was reported that 30% of the population would likely fall ill within six months, and that half of those would be confined to their beds. Ultimately, one out of every two persons would have acquired the disease at some point. This meant that about 700,000 Norwegians would have fallen ill, and in this period, 700 to 3,000 more deaths than a regular influenza season were to be expected.

The worst-case scenario was reported to be that 50% of the population would fall ill within six months, and half of those would be confined to their beds. In this case, 1.2 million Norwegians would have fallen ill in this period and an extra 5,000–13,000 deaths beyond the regular influenza season were expected.

Flu pandemics in Norway
Pandemic	Influenza A virus subtype	Population infected	People infected (approx)	Deaths	Case fatality rate(per 1000)
Spanish flu	H1N1	45%	2 million	28,574	6,45
Asian flu	H2N2	30-80%	1.3-3.5 million	2,632	0.59
Hong Kong flu	H3N2	15-40%	665,000-1.8 million	3,291	0.74
Russian flu	H2N2	9%	400,000	0	0.00

== Preparations ==
Norway had a stockpile of 1.4 million doses of Tamiflu and had ordered 200,000 doses of Relenza.

The Norwegian Institute of Public Health (FHI) said on 5 January that it would be only a matter of time before the virus was transmitted within Norway, and that cases of travelers falling ill should be expected within the next few weeks. According to the FHI, efforts at the time were being made to reduce the spread of the virus in Norway.

As of 15 May, the Norwegian government lifted their advisory against travel to Mexico, even so, people with increased risk of infection were advised to reconsider the need to travel.

In early May, Norway pre-ordered 4.7 million doses of the then not-yet-developed Swine Influenza vaccine. The price was estimated to be $47.5 million. Regarding the order, Health Care Minister Bjarne Håkon Hanssen said

The contract we are entering into will make it possible to secure vaccine for the population before a pandemic is declared. For myself and for the government it is important to follow up on the advice from the Pandemic Committee... This is also in line with professional advice from the health institutions.

=== Vaccine ===
As of autumn 2009, Norway was supplied with 9.4 million doses of the influenza vaccine from GlaxoSmithKline; every Norwegian could be given up to two doses. The vaccine was intended to be ready for use after clinical trials in November or December, however, because swine influenza still was considered to be a mild disease, the influenza vaccine could not be used without approval by the European Medicines Agency (EMEA).

==== Distribution ====
Norway had enough vaccine for every citizen by autumn 2009. Health personnel, as well as people with an increased risk of complications, were advised to receive early vaccinations. The Healthcare Ministry provided recommendations for which groups to prioritize in vaccination distribution.

== Outbreak ==
Confirmed cases in Norway by counties (as of 4 November 2009)
County	Confirmed cases
Total	3 047
Oslo	604
Akershus	332
Hordaland	300
Sør-Trøndelag	299
Vest-Agder	279
Rogaland	242
Buskerud	228
Møre og Romsdal	139
Vestfold	190
Nord-Trøndelag	69
Sogn og Fjordane	62
Aust-Agder	55
Nordland	52
Østfold	47
Troms	44
Oppland	33
Hedmark	29
Telemark	29
Finnmark	13

Age of the confirmed cases in Norway (as of 2 November 2009)
Age	Confirmed cases
Total	2 982
< 1	29
1-9	422
10-19	970
20-29	687
30-39	342
40-49	283
50-59	195
60-69	40
70-79	11
80-89	2
90-99	1

The Norwegian Institute of Public Health (FHI) updated their homepage with information about the swine flu outbreak in Norway every day at 10:00 (UTC). FHI believed that the Northern Hemisphere would not be greatly affected by the virus, with the exception of a few outbreaks in enclosed places (schools and other institutions, cruise ships), followed by a bigger epidemic in autumn or winter.

On 9 May, two Norwegian students from Oslo and Telemark, were confirmed to be infected with swine flu after they came home from studying in Mexico. Neither of them became seriously ill and they recovered quickly. These were the first two cases of swine influenza in Norway.

On 19 May, a Norwegian woman from Oslo was confirmed to be infected with swine flu after coming home from the United States. This was the third confirmed case of swine influenza in Norway.

On 20 May, a Norwegian man from Vest-Agder was confirmed to be infected with swine influenza after returning from a trip to the United States. This was the fourth confirmed case of swine influenza in Norway.

On 27 May, a Norwegian man was confirmed to be infected with swine influenza in Düsseldorf, Germany. The man was put in isolation where he stayed for 10 days. He showed obvious symptoms of influenza on the flight from the United States to Germany, and when he exited the plane, he was met by four doctors. His trip home to Norway was delayed. This case, however, is not reported as a Norwegian case of swine influenza, but a German one.

On 29 May, a Norwegian woman from Oslo was confirmed to be infected with swine influenza after returning from a trip to the United States. She was the fifth confirmed case in Norway.

On 30 May, two Norwegians were confirmed to be infected with swine influenza. One of them was a woman from Rogaland returning from Mexico; the other one was a woman from Oslo returning from the United States. These were the sixth and seventh confirmed swine influenza cases in Norway.

On 3 June, a Norwegian woman coming home from the United States was confirmed to be infected with swine influenza. This is the eighth confirmed case of swine influenza.

On 4 June, a Norwegian woman from Vest-Agder who recently had been to the United States was confirmed to be infected with swine influenza. This was the ninth confirmed case of swine influenza.

On 9 June, two Norwegian men from Vest-Agder and Oslo who recently had been to the United States were confirmed to be infected with swine influenza. These were the 10th and 11th cases of swine influenza in Norway.

On 10 June, a Norwegian man from Vest-Agder was confirmed to be infected with swine influenza. Although he had not been infected abroad, he had been living with a person who had been infected abroad. This was the first domestic infection and was the 12th case of swine influenza in Norway.

On 11 June, a Norwegian man from Oslo was confirmed to be infected with swine influenza. He had not recently been traveling abroad. This was the second domestic infection and the 13th case of swine influenza in Norway.

On 12 June, a Norwegian man from Buskerud was confirmed to be infected with swine influenza. He had not been traveling abroad but was working with an infected person. This was the third domestic infection and 14th case of swine influenza in Norway.

On 13 June, a Norwegian woman from Rogaland was confirmed to be infected with swine influenza. She had recently been to the United States and was infected there. This was the 15th case of swine influenza in Norway.

On 15 June, a Norwegian man from Sør-Trøndelag was confirmed to be infected with swine influenza. He had recently been on a trip to the United States. This was the 16th case of swine influenza in Norway and first case of swine influenza in Sør-Trøndelag.

On 17 June, a Norwegian man from Akershus was confirmed to be infected with swine influenza. He had recently been to the United States. This was the 17th case of swine influenza in Norway.

On 18 June, a Norwegian man from Rogaland and two women from Akershus were confirmed to be infected with swine influenza. They had all recently been in the United States and were the 18th, 19th, and 20th cases of swine influenza in Norway.

On 23 June, a Norwegian woman from Oslo and a Norwegian woman from Østfold were confirmed to be infected with swine influenza. They had recently been in the United States and were the 21st and 22nd cases of swine influenza in Norway.

On 24 June, a Norwegian woman from Oslo was confirmed to be infected with swine influenza. She had recently been in England and was the 23rd case of swine influenza in Norway.

On 25 June, a Norwegian man from Oslo was confirmed to be infected with swine influenza. He had recently been in Argentina and was the 24th case of swine influenza in Norway.

On 26 June, a Norwegian woman from Sogn og Fjordane was confirmed to be infected with swine influenza. She had recently been in Greece and was the 25th case of swine influenza in Norway.

On 29 June, a Norwegian woman from Hordaland was confirmed to be infected with swine influenza. She had recently been in the United States and was the 26th case of swine influenza in Norway.

On 30 June, four Norwegian women (one from Oslo, one from Østfold and two from Sør-Trøndelag), two Norwegian men (one from Oslo and one from Sør-Trøndelag), and a Norwegian boy from Østfold were confirmed to be infected with swine influenza. They had all been traveling abroad; five of them had recently been in the United States, and the other two had recently been in Argentina. These were the 27th, 28th, 29th, 30th, 31st, 32nd and 33rd cases of swine influenza in Norway.

On 1 July, seven Norwegians were confirmed to be infected with swine influenza. They were passengers on a cruise ship that had docked in Oslo. The sick passengers had not gone ashore and did not infect any persons on land. These cases were not counted as Norwegian cases and were therefore not included in the Norwegian total.

On 2 July, a Norwegian woman from Bergen was confirmed to be infected with swine influenza. She had recently been in the United States. This was the 34th case of swine influenza in Norway.

On 3 September, the first confirmed death caused by swine flu in Norway was reported.

On 10 September, the third death was reported.

On 19 October, the seventh death was confirmed in Bergen in a previously healthy male who was in his 50s.

On 20 October, an alarming increase in absences caused by flu was reported at primary schools in Oslo and Bergen. In one school, over half of the elementary school students were absent because of the flu.

On 20 October, the eighth death from the flu was confirmed as a woman in her twenties in Akershus county.

On 22 October, the city of Bergen started widespread vaccination and a long queue of persons was reported.

On 22 October, the ninth death from the flu was confirmed as a woman in her fifties in Akershus county.

On 23 October, the 10th death from the flu was confirmed as a two-year-old child in Vest-Agder county.

On 26 October, the 11th death from the flu was confirmed as a nine-year-old child in Oslo.

On 28 October, the 12th and 13 deaths from the flu were reported.

On 30 October, the 14th death from flu was confirmed. A woman in her forties from Ringsaker died at the hospital in Hamar.

On 2 November, the 15th death from flu was announced. A woman less than 20 years of age from Hedmark county died on 1 November at Rikshospitalet.
