= 1957–1958 influenza pandemic =

- Disease: Influenza
- Pathogen: Strains of A/H2N2
- Location: Worldwide
- Date: 1957–1958
- Deaths: 1–4 million (estimates)

The 1957–1958 Asian flu pandemic was a global pandemic of influenza A virus subtype H2N2 that originated in Guizhou in Southern China. The number of excess deaths caused by the pandemic is estimated to be 1–4 million around the world (1957–1958 and probably beyond), making it one of the deadliest pandemics in history. A decade later, a reassorted viral strain H3N2 further caused the Hong Kong flu pandemic (1968–1970).

== History ==
=== Origin and outbreak in China ===
The first cases were reported in Guizhou of southern China, in 1956 or in early 1957. Observers within China noted an epidemic beginning in the third week of February in western Guizhou, between its capital Guiyang and the city of Qujing in neighbouring Yunnan province. They were soon reported in Yunnan in late February or early March 1957. By the middle of March, the flu had spread all over China.

The People's Republic of China was not a member of the World Health Organization at the time (not until 1981), and did not inform other countries about the outbreak. The United States CDC, however, contradicting most records, states that the flu was "first reported in Singapore in February 1957".

In late 1957, a second wave of the flu took place in Northern China, especially in rural areas. In the same year, in response to the epidemic, the Chinese government established the Chinese National Influenza Center (CNIC), which soon published a manual on influenza in 1958.

=== International spread ===
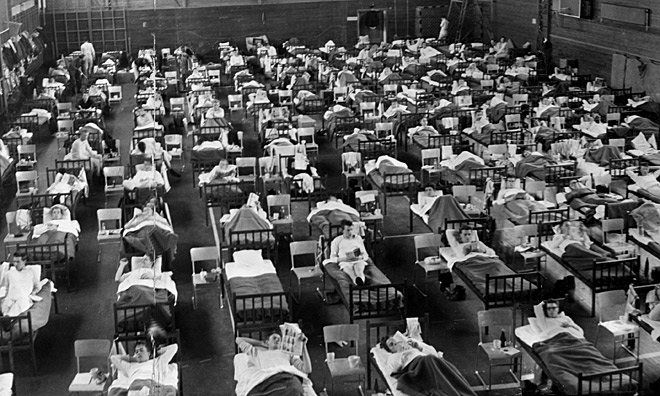
168 sick patients with Asian flu in a sports arena in Luleå, Sweden (1957).

On 17 April 1957, The Times reported that "an influenza epidemic has affected thousands of Hong Kong residents". The same day The New York Times reported that local press estimated at least 250,000 persons were receiving treatment by that time, out of the colony's total population of about 2.5 million. The recent influx of about 700,000 refugees from mainland China had intensified authorities' fears of epidemics and fires due to crowded conditions, and according to a report received by the US Influenza Information Center on 3 May, the disease was said to be occurring mainly among these refugees.

By the end of the month (or as early as February), Singapore also experienced an outbreak of the new flu, which peaked in mid-May with 680 deaths. The only National Influenza Center reporting data to the World Health Organization for the southeast Asian region in 1957 was located in Singapore, and thus the country was the first to notify the WHO on 4 May about an extensive outbreak of the flu which "appeared to have been introduced from Hong Kong". By the end of May, the outbreak had spread across Mainland Southeast Asia and also involved Indonesia, the Philippines, and Japan. In Taiwan, 100,000 were affected by mid-May.

India suffered a million cases by June. In late June, the pandemic reached the United Kingdom.

By June 1957, it reached the United States, where it initially caused few infections. Some of the first people affected were US Navy personnel at destroyers docked at Naval Station Newport and new military recruits elsewhere. The first wave peaked in October and affected mainly children who recently returned to school after summer break. The second wave, in January and February 1958, was more pronounced among elderly people and so was more fatal.

==== Eurasia ====
===== Asia =====
====== India ======
The Government of India Influenza Centre in Coonoor received word of the potential spread of the pandemic to India on 11 May and therefore decided to watch for the arrival of probable cases at Calcutta and Madras and to isolate the virus from such cases there. On 15 May, it was learned that the steamer S.S. Rajula was experiencing an outbreak of influenza en route from Singapore and had been redirected to Madras instead of its first port of call in Negapatam. Upon the ship's arrival on 16 May, 44 active cases of influenza were discovered on board, and the ship was accordingly placed in quarantine at sea and boarded by medical officers to examine and treat the sick. Two days later, four of the nurses who had boarded the ship became ill themselves, and thus the epidemic in India was considered to have begun.

Bombay reported its first cases on 21 May, and cases appeared in Calcutta that same week. Although the infections in Madras were considered the start of the outbreak in India, it is not clear whether Madras was indeed affected first and the other cities were infected as a result or whether all three cities were in fact affected independently of one another. It is likely they were infected independently but within just a few days of one another. Following the discharge of thousands of passengers from SS Rajula on 21 May and SS State of Madras on 28 May, the States of Madras, Mysore, Kerala, and Andhra apparently became heavily infected.

The epidemic spread throughout all of India within six weeks. Across the country the outbreak assumed a pattern of first sweeping through the most crowded cities and then spreading slowly across villages and other towns. Maximum spread appeared to occur during the week of 2–8 June when numerous cities and towns all across the country became involved in the outbreak. Thereafter, the spread became "one in depth and intensity in the areas already affected."

During the first seven weeks of the epidemic (i.e., up to 6 July), its extent (i.e., the proportion of total cases up to 8 February 1958) varied widely across the country. New Delhi, for example, had already experienced 88% of its total caseload, while Bihar had seen only 3% of its total cases. By 10 August, or twelve weeks into the outbreak, most states had experienced at least 75% of their total caseload. The "main wave" of the pandemic in India had thus swept across the entire country within 12 weeks of the introduction of the virus in mid-May. Influenza continued to occur after 10 August, but the incidence of the disease in affected areas merely represented the "permanent infiltration" of the pandemic virus into the population. By 21 November, the epidemic had nearly concluded in all states except Tripura, where there had been a slight increase in activity.

Between 19 May 1957 and 8 February 1958, India reported 4,451,785 cases of influenza and 1,098 deaths, representing a case fatality rate of 242 deaths per 1 million cases.

====== Japan ======
During the winter of 1956–1957, Japan experienced an influenza epidemic caused by both type A and type B influenza viruses. It began about the end of November 1956, nearly subsiding by the end of the year in the Tokyo area but persisting until March 1957 in some rural areas. Subsequently, no further influenza activity was expected until the following winter. However, at the beginning of May 1957, influenza suddenly broke out again, appearing first in Tokyo and Kyoto Prefectures before spreading to other parts of the main island; by the end of May, the disease had spread all across the country. It was soon confirmed that this new outbreak was due to the novel influenza virus.

The epidemic peaked in mid-June and then declined in the latter half of the month, remaining in only a few prefectures by the middle to end of July. Although it was considered largely over by August, sporadic outbreaks continued to occur throughout the month, mostly in rural areas. Upon the reopening of schools in early September, the epidemic resurged, with scattered outbreaks appearing in primary and secondary schools in various localities. On 22 November, the epidemic was reported as having once again spread across the entire country, though it was considered "to be of limited importance", remaining as mild as it had been in the spring.

By mid-December, over 1 million cases had been reported in school settings, and the outbreak had apparently passed its peak in most areas. There was another small peak in early 1958, though this could be considered merely a protraction of the second wave. Tens of thousands of cases continued to be reported from schools through January, with several Tokyo-area schools closing some of their classes due to outbreaks at the end of the month. The number of new cases had dropped dramatically, however, with 340 reported in 15 schools during the week ending 1 February, as compared with 60,000 in 370 schools between 22 December and 4 January and 258,000 in 1,818 schools during the week ending 30 November.

Japan was one of a few countries that experienced a widespread second wave of morbidity. It was found that areas less affected during the first wave ended up being more so during the second. On the whole, the disease was not very severe, and mortality during the second wave was comparable to that during the first. Still, mortality rates were notably high among infants and the elderly, and in total there were 7,735 deaths, with a case-fatality rate calculated to be 0.8%.

====== Turkey ======
Pandemic influenza reached Iran, Iraq, and Syria in July 1957. Considering the extensive trade between Turkey and Syria and traffic between Turkey and Iran, it was clear that the virus would soon reach Turkey as well. Therefore, the Ministry of Health and Social Welfare initiated the precautionary measures to deal with the passengers arriving in Turkey by air and sea and the Mecca pilgrims arriving over land, sending two specialists at the end of July to observe the situation in the cities in the southeast and to take throat swabs and washings and serum samples for examination. Influenza infections were thus discovered within the civilian population and police and military units.

Cases were detected in Erzurum and Ankara during the first week of August, and by the following week, cases were being reported from almost every part of the country. Given that schools were on holiday and the agricultural population was in the fields at this time, epidemic influenza was observed only in the larger cities and among factory workers, military units, and other concentrated communities during August and September. Once schools opened in October, however, cases began to appear among the students and the disease spread rapidly. Schools soon had to be closed again because 25–30% of students were absent due to illness. The epidemic peaked that same month and then declined through April 1958.

Between August 1957 and May 1958, 378,330 cases of influenza were reported among the civilian population. If twice that number (i.e., 756,660) is taken as the number of unreported and subclinical cases, and the 31,356 military cases are factored in as well, then approximately 1,166,346 persons can be assumed to have suffered from pandemic influenza in Turkey in 1957–1958. Furthermore, a total of 32 deaths from influenza were reported between September 1957 and January 1958, all occurring in individuals under the age of 5 or over the age of 50.

===== Europe =====
====== Croatia ======
Pandemic influenza appeared in Croatia in August 1957, increased dramatically in September, and then peaked in October. Although the epidemic had largely subsided by the end of the year, infections continued during the first four months of 1958.

====== East Germany ======
The pandemic broke out in East Germany in October 1957 and peaked that same month. After a month of quiescence, there was a recurrence of the epidemic before it finally ended in December.

====== Netherlands ======
Pandemic influenza first appeared in the Netherlands in June 1957. Between June and August, sporadic cases occurred as a result of laboratory infection, a visit to an airfield, and introductions from Indonesia, Turkey, England, and Rome and the Near East. The first focus was a school in Bussum, which had no known link with Asia but where the first cases nonetheless appeared on 14 June. Rotterdam was likely another initial focus, as cases appeared there at the end of June in at least three schools. Subsequently to these outbreaks, influenza appeared in several boarding schools and other institutions in Bussum and Rotterdam and in other towns and villages in the vicinity. Foci continued to appear in August, though no widespread epidemics developed yet during this time.

The true nationwide outbreak of influenza began during the period 20 August to 7 September. After boarding schools reopened at the start of September, seeding of the virus became more extensive, and the disease broke out in several of the schools. The first wave lasted about two months, but the disease continued to spread for some time thereafter. "A definite recrudescence of clinical influenza", as well as mortality, occurred during the early part of 1958, beginning in January, peaking in late February, and then declining into April. A serological survey conducted in the summer of 1958 indicated that older age groups experienced notably lower levels of illness during the first wave. However, during the second wave, older individuals were observed to be more seriously affected, and mortality notably shifted to the 60–90-year-old age groups during this period. In total, there were 1,230 deaths due to pandemic influenza reported between 1 September and 30 November 1957 and 877 reported between 1 November 1957 and 1 May 1958.

The Netherlands was one of the few countries to experience a widespread second wave of morbidity. Most European countries, as well as the United States, saw another wave of mortality after the first, but this was generally not accompanied by a widespread recurrence of epidemic influenza. As far as the Netherlands is concerned, the recrudescence in early 1958 might be attributable to the "'winter' factor or factors" that typically precipitate influenza activity.

====== Poland ======
Foci of influenza began to appear in three southern provinces of Poland during the week of 7–13 July 1957, but no significant rise in morbidity occurred until the following month. During the week of 5–11 August, influenza broke out in Katowice Province and thereafter began to increase gradually. The rest of the country was not affected until the week of 7–13 October, when influenza activity began to rise above the interepidemic level. Nationally, the epidemic peaked during the week of 28 October to 3 November and then concluded later that month.

====== United Kingdom ======
The first reported case of pandemic influenza in the United Kingdom occurred on 6 June 1957, via importation, while the first outbreak was recognized in London on 17 June 1957 in Pakistani seamen who had arrived in the country by air on the 13th.

Localized outbreaks of the disease developed over the summer, from mid-June to mid-August, while importations of the virus continued throughout July and August. The first indigenous case of influenza was noted on 28 June. Beginning in early July, outbreaks occurred among troops returning from affected areas in the East. On 9 July, Scouts from around the world began arriving in England to attend the 9th World Scout Jamboree, to be held in August; outbreaks immediately developed among them beginning 10 July. From 15 July onwards, indigenous cases came to be known, and 27 outbreaks were reported from certain groups in the first half of August alone.

During the week ending 24 August, the first reports indicating involvement of the general population were received, starting with an outbreak among schoolchildren in Colne that affected teachers and parents as well. Outbreaks were subsequently reported in Nottingham, Orrell (near Wigan), West Riding of Yorkshire, Sheffield, and Bradford.

From these foci the epidemic spread across England, beginning in the north and moving south, progressively involving every region of the country towards the end of August and into September. Besides in East and West Riding, where it peaked during the week ending 24 September, the epidemic reached its peak in every region sometime during the first half of October.

In Wales, the course of the epidemic was mostly the same as in England, though incidence was likely lower. The disease appeared first in small groups of children before affecting the rest of the community. The epidemic peaked at the end of September, and by 20 October, the epidemic was declining or was already over.

A second wave of mortality began in December and peaked about mid-January. As in the United States, the cause of this recrudescence is not entirely clear, though older people seemed to be more affected. It is possible that the excess mortality was due to infection of these individuals with the pandemic virus after they had evaded it in the autumn. Additionally, the mildness of the winter of 1956–1957, during which the death rate was unusually low, might have left behind a group of vulnerable individuals now susceptible to die from even a mild infection or the onset of colder weather. Overall, however, the number of deaths during the first quarter of 1958 was still less than that of recent years.

From August 1957 to January 1958, between 10 and 15 million people across the British Isles were affected. All-cause excess mortality totaled about 30,000 to 33,000, with 14,000 to 16,000 deaths attributable to influenza, bronchitis, and pneumonia, of which two-thirds were among those over the age of 55.

===== Soviet Union =====
The epidemic in the Soviet Union began during the first ten days of May 1957 with an increase in influenza activity in Tashkent, Stalinabad, Ashgabat, and other parts of Central Asia. Then, during the middle and latter parts of May, influenza increased in Omsk, Novosibirsk, and other cities of Western Siberia. During May and June, the epidemic spread in the form of limited outbreaks through the cities of Central Asia, towns along the Trans-Siberian Railway, and in some central areas of the European part of the country (e.g., Moscow, Leningrad). Influenza activity then declined through July, August, and September but remained higher in these areas than in previous years.

A second wave of morbidity began towards the end of September and the start of October, when influenza now increased throughout the entire country. Although the disease was more widespread than it had been in the spring, it was observed that those cities more seriously affected in the spring were more moderately affected in the autumn. The epidemic peaked in the latter half of October and then began to decrease in early November before falling back to unusual interepidemic levels in December, though morbidity remained slightly elevated during the first four months of 1958.

The people reportedly played a significant role in the prevention of the spread of the disease through health education work. This involved the mass publication of placards, posters, and pamphlets; systematic radio and television programs; the printing of articles on the disease in the press; and the showing of films on the topic, in addition to other similar measures.

==== North America ====
===== Canada =====
In Canada, the epidemic period spanned from September to November 1957, during which 3,373 excess deaths from all causes occurred. Of these, 1,312 were attributed to respiratory disease. All age groups saw increases in mortality due to respiratory disease during the pandemic, but the plurality of deaths occurred among those over the age of 65.

Nationally, Canada did not experience a widespread second wave of mortality, as the United States did. However, a second wave was observed in Quebec and in particular Montreal, where all-cause excess mortality in the winter of 1958 exceeded that incurred during the first wave in the fall.

===== United States =====
====== Background ======
Since the 1918 pandemic, epidemiological infrastructure in the US had expanded considerably. The Armed Forces Epidemiological Board and its Commission on Influenza were established in 1941, marking the beginning of the Armed Forces' involvement in the control of influenza. Among other activities, the Board maintained surveillance of influenza-like illness around the world, operating 176 stations by 1957. The Commission on Influenza also conducted studies into vaccination, which was considered "the only really effective control measure available in combating influenza".

The Communicable Disease Center (today the Centers for Disease Control and Prevention) was formed in 1946 initially for the control of malaria within military installations in the southeastern US. In light of developing Cold War–era concerns over biological warfare, the Epidemic Intelligence Service was created in 1951 at the CDC as a combined service and training program in the field of applied epidemiology, with the purpose of investigating certain disease outbreaks, among other activities.

====== National response ======
The notion that an influenza pandemic was developing in the Far East first occurred to American microbiologist Maurice Hilleman, who was alarmed by pictures of those affected by the virus in Hong Kong that were published in The New York Times, on 17 April 1957. Hilleman was then head of the Department of Respiratory Diseases at the Walter Reed Army Institute of Research. He immediately sent for virus samples from patients in the Far East, and, on 12 May, the first isolate was sent out to the vaccine manufacturers as soon as they all arrived in the US.

The Office of the Surgeon General became aware of the situation in Asia on 20 May. The Surgeon General, Leroy E. Burney, was out of the country at the time, representing the US at the Tenth World Health Assembly in Geneva. The Deputy Surgeon General, W. Palmer Dearing, therefore spread the word and established special liaison with the National Institutes of Health on Burney's behalf.

On 22 May, after working "around the clock" for the last five days, Hilleman's team reported that the viruses isolated in the Far East were type A but antigenically quite distinct from previously known strains. Hilleman predicted an epidemic would strike the US when schools reopened in the fall. The microbiologist was thereafter instrumental in stimulating the development of the pandemic vaccine.

The day after Hilleman's announcement, the Division of Foreign Quarantine began to monitor travelers from the Far East for signs of respiratory illness. All Epidemic Intelligence Service officers and all relevant personnel at the CDC were alerted of the priority of investigating cases and outbreaks of influenza-like disease at that time.

The Public Health Service formally began its participation in the national effort against the flu on 28 May. The Surgeons General of the military called a meeting with the Service to discuss the control of the novel influenza. The disease was noted for its mild presentation though high rates of attack in various settings. It was the opinion of those at the meeting that the virus was already in the US, but no epidemic was expected until the fall. It was recommended that the Department of Defense purchase about 3 million doses of monovalent vaccine targeting the pandemic virus. The Commission on Influenza was asked to propose the composition of the polyvalent vaccine to be used as well.

The following day, the director of the National Institutes of Health, James A. Shannon, having consulted with CDC Director Robert J. Anderson, submitted a memo that recommended, among other items, that the monovalent pandemic vaccine needed for the Department of Defense be licensed, that state epidemiologists be alerted to watch for outbreaks of influenza-like illness, that EIS officers immediately investigate any reported outbreak, and that "the role of influenza vaccine as a public health measure be carefully studied...".

On 31 May, Dearing reflected on the 1918 pandemic and how new strains of influenza emerge, "presumably by mutation", which may spark another pandemic at any time. In writing, he indicated his support for a mass immunization program, saying that, if epidemiologists did find the present situation "unusual or almost unique", then the burden of proof would shift to opponents of such a program. He asked the principal staff officers to explore whether "the investment of the few million dollars necessary" to organize an immunization campaign would be advisable, if the situation indeed justified it.

Broad planning of the PHS response to the pandemic began that same day with a meeting between officials of the three bureaus and an assistant to the Surgeon General. The attendees discussed the coordination of PHS activities, improvement of influenza reporting, and the use of vaccine as a public health measure. It was also requested that the Division of Foreign Quarantine work with the Epidemic Intelligence Service and issue reports to the National Office of Vital Statistics. The CDC was similarly asked to alert State health authorities, intensify flu surveillance, and report findings to the same office.

As the PHS response came into focus, there was much communication between the Service and Congress. When he returned to the US on 7 June, Burney wrote to the chairmen of the relevant committees and subcommittees in the Senate and the House of Representatives updating them on the situation and summarizing what had been done so far.

On 10 June, the newly formed Advisory Committee on Influenza met for the first time. The group consisted of representatives of a broad array of medical and health professions. In addition to what to do about vaccination, a key finding of the meeting was that no major outbreaks were expected before the fall, though sporadic cases were likely throughout the summer. Following this meeting, Burney held a press conference to discuss the influenza situation, and public interest in influenza subsequently grew.

With the first phase of the Asian influenza program concluded, the pace of PHS activities increased dramatically. The second, developmental phase began on 12 June with a meeting of representatives of the vaccine manufacturers with NIH. Another meeting was held on the 20th, during which various alternatives for the course of the virus in the US and how to respond to each were discussed. This framework was later presented to the Secretary of Health, Education, and Welfare on 24 June.

On 26 June, Burney met with representatives of the American Medical Association to discuss the virus and how best to employ medical manpower against a serious epidemic. It was noted that the public had already learned about the virus from newspapers and television but not how it could protect itself. It was thus agreed that PHS and AMA would conduct a joint campaign of public health education to address this. Recommendations on this score were discussed at the AMA headquarters in Chicago on 9 July during a meeting between an assistant to the Surgeon General and AMA officials.

On 27 June, NIH reported its plans for influenza research that would take advantage of the unique opportunity that was the pandemic. These included clinical studies of those afflicted with the disease, with emphasis on potential cardiovascular and systemic effects; studies of the factors contributing to increased mortality among elderly and debilitated patients; and studies of the disease among vaccinated communities. On 3 July, the director of the National Institute of Allergy and Infectious Diseases, Justin M. Andrews, was designated the "focal point" at NIH for flu-related matters.

On 9 July, the CDC issued its first influenza report. These reports, which would continue on a weekly basis for the duration of the pandemic, summarized laboratory information and epidemiological reports from State health departments and various other sources.

On 19 July, PHS officials met with the Undersecretary of Health, Education, and Welfare to discuss the plans of the Service and other cooperating parties to respond to the expected epidemic and to take advantage of research opportunities afforded by the situation.

At the beginning of August, PHS gave the go-ahead to the press to initiate its public health education campaign, and Burney met with journalists to warn of "the very definite probability" of a widespread epidemic in the fall or winter.

On 7 August, President Dwight D. Eisenhower asked Congress to appropriate $500,000 for PHS to allow it to prepare for the epidemic. In addition, he requested authority to transfer about $2 million of public health funds for the same purpose. A week later, Burney testified before the Senate Appropriations Committee to discuss this request. The Senate passed the Supplemental Appropriation Act on the 19th, and it became law on the 28th. It provided a total of $800,000 in additional PHS funds to go towards the production and distribution of tests, surveillance and laboratory services, data collection and dissemination, and public health education. Two hundred and seventy-five thousand dollars previously appropriated for communicable disease control was authorized for transfer to flu-related activities, and a further $2 million of emergency funds was made available to the president for transfer.

On 14 August, PHS met with representatives of official, voluntary, and professional groups in the fields of health, education, and welfare to plan out their cooperation to respond to the epidemic. Two days later, PHS met with representatives of the Army, the Committee on Disaster Studies of the National Academy of Sciences-Natural Research Council, the University of Pennsylvania, and the AMA to consider proposals for studying the effects of an epidemic on the organization and function of communities.

The Association of State and Territorial Health Officers convened in Bethesda, Maryland, and Washington, D.C., beginning on 27 August for a two-day special meeting to discuss the pandemic response. Participants were divided into committees to discuss the key aspects of the issue and to develop guidelines and suggestions. Among other items, recommendations concerned the manner of epidemic surveillance should, the establishment of a national reporting system, the provision of technical assistance by PHS, the futility of shuttering schools or restricting public gatherings, and the formation of a national commission on influenza and lower-level advisory committees. With this meeting the Asian influenza program thus moved into its next, operational phase.

====== Epidemic ======
The first recognized cases and outbreaks of pandemic influenza in the US occurred among military personnel. Between 20 May and 18 June, seven ships arriving at San Francisco from the Far East reported outbreaks of flu-like illness while at sea, and four of these had active cases on board at the time of their arrival. Serological tests indicated significant titer rises to the pandemic virus. On 22 May, the naval destroyer USS Barry arrived at Naval Station Newport, in Rhode Island, having spent no time in Far East waters at all. Nonetheless, beginning on 2 June, an outbreak of flu-like illness occurred upon the docked ship, and six others in the same unit subsequently experienced outbreaks of a similar disease between 10 and 17 June. Virus isolations revealed that the pandemic virus was responsible for these outbreaks.

Later that month, the first recognized civilian outbreak began on the campus of the University of California, Davis, where the American Legion Auxiliary California Girls State program was holding its 1957 session. A total of 391 high-school girls from all across the state traveled to Davis via chartered buses and arrived on 17 June. The next day, two came down with illness. Subsequently, until 25 June, 224 girls and four adult staff members became ill but experienced generally mild symptoms, with only two suffering minimal complications. Virus isolations revealed the infections to be pandemic influenza.

On 26 June, a Westminster Fellowship Conference convened at Grinnell College in Iowa, bringing together 1,688 delegates from 43 states and 10 countries. Among the participants was a delegation of over 100 students from California, at least one of whom had been present at the Girls State conference in Davis, where influenza had broken out the week before. This student, and subsequently others in her group, developed influenza on the way to the Iowa conference. Once there, this group was split up and housed in various crowded dormitories for the duration of the conference. Cases of influenza rapidly mounted throughout the week, and by 1 July, around 200 had been reported, only four of which were adults. In light of the outbreak, the conference was disbanded, and those who were not sick began to depart on 1 July, nonetheless carrying infection all across the country.

Throughout July, pandemic influenza was seeded widely throughout the country, though there was yet little evidence of community-wide outbreaks. From 12 to 18 July, the fourth National Boy Scout Jamboree was held in Valley Forge, Pennsylvania, where over 52,000 Scouts and leaders from every state and several foreign countries came together for the week-long affair. Vice President Richard Nixon was the guest of honor at the pageant, the Valley Forge Story, and country music singer Jimmy Dean provided entertainment. There was some evidence of influenza among Scouts from California, Louisiana, and Puerto Rico, as many fell ill en route to the Jamboree. By the end of the event, about 1,000 cases of febrile respiratory illness had been reported, with all 38 sections affected, but there was ultimately no large-scale epidemic. Nonetheless, in the days following the Jamboree, a number of outbreaks appeared among Scout groups returning from the event, and cases were subsequently reported from various states including Louisiana, Connecticut, Massachusetts, South Carolina, Virginia, Wyoming, Montana, and Texas.

In August, sporadic cases of influenza continued to appear. In the early part of the month, the first major community-wide outbreak occurred in Tangipahoa Parish, Louisiana. This outbreak was clearly associated with the opening of summer school sessions in that parish. The first major urban outbreak appeared in New Orleans shortly thereafter. When several Mississippi counties also experienced community outbreaks upon the reopening of schools in mid-August, it became clear that a nationwide epidemic was all but certain to occur with the general opening of public schools.

Indeed, in September, when schools reopened in most parts of the country, explosive outbreaks began, first in high schools and colleges and then in elementary schools and preschools, before spreading out into the general community. By the end of the month, influenza had been reported from at least 197 counties (over the course of 18 weeks), at least 16 of which across seven states had apparently experienced community-wide outbreaks. By the end of the following week, 88 new counties had reported the appearance of influenza.

Having involved the West Coast, as well as Louisiana and Mississippi, over the summer, followed by, in rapid succession, the highly populated areas in the East in early September and New Mexico, Utah, and Arizona around the same time, influenza then appeared to progress toward the central and northern parts of the country in October. Excess mortality began to rise in the West South Central division in early October and soon rose across the entire country, with New York, New Jersey, and Pennsylvania seeing the greatest relative increase. By the end of October, nearly every state was reporting influenza outbreaks in 50% of their counties.

The epidemic appeared to reach its peak in late October to early November before declining into December, and mortality began to decrease for the first time around the middle of November.

In December, Burney spoke on the country's epidemic experience thus far and the current influenza situation. He shared the findings of the US National Health Survey, which found that, between 1 July and 1 December 1957, over 80 million Americans—or about half the country—suffered from upper respiratory illness so severe that they had to spend one or more days in bed. Though not all cases could be attributed to pandemic influenza, he considered it reasonable to suppose that it accounted for most of the illnesses. He warned of the possibility of a "second wave", such as that experienced in Japan, and shared the expectation that a considerable amount of influenza might occur in the coming winter months. Accordingly, he urged continued vaccinations to guard against any recurrence of the disease.

In January 1958, mortality from influenza and pneumonia, as well as all causes, began to trend upward once again. Although pandemic influenza was still occurring sporadically, no widespread outbreaks were being reported. The cause of this increase in mortality, therefore, was not clear. The data indicated that those over the age of 65 were most affected and that the deaths were mostly a result of pneumonia rather than influenza; in fact, excess deaths due to influenza were far below those reported during the fall epidemic. With respect to nonrespiratory causes, deaths had increased mainly in the category of cardiovascular diseases. Deaths finally peaked on 1 March and thereafter declined continuously into May.

It is not clear what caused the increased mortality in the early months of 1958, though various explanations were suggested. Burney speculated that these deaths might have been "the result of weakening effects of earlier 'flu' attacks upon older persons" with underlying conditions or other respiratory infections, while the CDC suggested that these individuals might have evaded infection during the fall epidemic altogether due to their more secluded lifestyles but were now being affected. Another hypothesis was that the deaths were the result of staphylococcal pneumonia, as a number of deaths had been caused by that infection in the fall. Mortality data and information from hospital centers, however, did not support this. The cause of this "second wave" of mortality therefore remains a mystery.

During the fall epidemic, although all age groups saw some increase in mortality, the highest rates occurred in individuals under the age of 1 and those over the age of 65. Eighty percent of the excess deaths from September and December 1957 occurred in those over the age of 54; from January to March 1958, this proportion rose to 85% for the same age group. In total, between 60,000 and 70,000 excess deaths occurred in the United States during the entire epidemic period from October 1957 to March 1958.

=== World Health Organization's response ===
The 1957–1958 pandemic was the first influenza pandemic to occur since the creation of the World Health Organization in 1947. Memories of the 1918 pandemic were still ever-present. In recognition of the worldwide threat of epidemic influenza, the WHO launched its Global Influenza Programme in 1947 with the establishment of the World Influenza Centre at the National Institute for Medical Research in London. This eventually gave rise to the Global Influenza Surveillance Network in 1952 to facilitate global scientific collaboration and fulfil the objectives of the programme.

In 1957, China was not a member of the WHO, and thus it was not a part of its influenza surveillance network. Therefore, it took several weeks, if not months, for the news of an outbreak to reach the WHO, when the virus had already spread into Hong Kong and then to Singapore. This fact would be lamented repeatedly after the pandemic, and it was taken as reinforcement of the importance of a "truly worldwide" network of epidemiological surveillance.

Following this delay, things then "moved swiftly". After receiving the report out of Singapore in early May, the WHO reported on the developing outbreak for the first time in its Weekly Epidemiological Record published on 10 May. Within three weeks laboratories around the world had concluded that the cause of these epidemics was a new variant of influenza A. This information was first reported in the Weekly Epidemiological Record for 29 May.

On 14 June, the WHO declared that attempts at large-scale quarantine were "as costly as they are ineffective", instead recommending only that acute cases be isolated. It reiterated that all reports it had received emphasized the mildness of the disease in most cases, with the very few deaths having occurred mainly in elderly victims suffering from chronic bronchitis.

The need for a single, consistent name for the novel virus became clear as it continued to spread and became more commonly discussed. Up to this point, the causative agent had mostly been called "Far East influenza virus" or "Far East strain (influenza virus)" or even "Oriental flu", though "Asian influenza" had been used before. On 11 July, the question was finally taken up at an informal meeting of scientists during the Fourth International Poliomyelitis Congress in Geneva. There it was agreed that "Asian influenza" was a "descriptive and appropriate" name for the "contemporary manifestation of the ancient disease", as the term "Far East" was considered "not exact as to geographical location".

On 23 July, the WHO issued a circular letter advising that surplus vaccine be made available to poorer countries at the "lowest economic price".

On 16 August, William J. Tepsix, commander of Pennsylvania's Veterans of Foreign Wars in the United States, sent a letter to United Nations Secretary-General Dag Hammarskjold demanding an investigation into whether the virus had been released by the Soviet Union or China. It is not clear if the UN or the WHO ever responded to Tepsix's letter. However, US Surgeon General Leroy E. Burney would later dismiss this notion on 26 August in response to a similar question raised by the press.

On 11 October, the WHO announced that the virus had spread to all populated parts of the world aside from "a few islands or territories having no contact with the outside world".

Following the main phase of the pandemic in 1957, the WHO reflected on its performance as part of its review of the first ten years of the organization in 1958. It concluded that "the WHO influenza programme fulfilled the major task allotted to it", which allowed "many parts of the world to organize health services to meet the threat and for some countries to attempt to protect priority groups by vaccination". However, it acknowledged that had its influenza surveillance network been "truly worldwide", as it would repeatedly lament it was not, then preparations could have begun two months earlier.

=== Vaccine ===
==== Background ====
In December 1942, Dr. Thomas Francis Jr., and his colleagues on the United States Armed Forces' Commission on Influenza (including Jonas Salk, future developer of the inactivated polio vaccine) began a series of key studies into the use of inactivated influenza virus vaccines, which for the first time demonstrated the protective effect of such vaccines against infection. Similar studies into their efficacy and safety continued until 1945, when the first inactivated virus vaccine entered the market for commercial use. In the fall of that year and the spring of 1946, the entirety of the Armed Forces received the inactivated virus vaccine.

During the winter of 1946–1947, a worldwide influenza epidemic occurred, an event that for some time was itself considered a pandemic due to its global distribution albeit low mortality. Vaccines that had been effective during the 1943–1944 and 1944–1945 seasons suddenly failed during this epidemic. It was found that the influenza A virus had undergone significant antigenic drift, resulting in a virus that was quite antigenically distinct, but not one of an entirely new subtype. This experience demonstrated the necessity to alter vaccine composition to match newly circulating strains.

In the winter of 1950–1951, a severe influenza epidemic ravaged England and Wales, the number of weekly deaths at one point even surpassing that of the 1918 pandemic in Liverpool. Public health experts in the US, fearing the implications of the outbreak on their country, decided to impose a challenge on themselves: to see how quickly the British virus could be imported into the US, its antigenic structure analyzed, and then incorporated into a new vaccine, if the virus were found to be distinct from preexisting strains. Upon receipt of the strains at the laboratories at Walter Reed Army Institute of Research and the National Institute of Allergy and Infectious Diseases, which then sent samples to the vaccine manufacturers, the two government laboratories were able to produce the required 1 liter of vaccine of "acceptable potency, sterility, and safety" in three weeks; the manufacturers were soon to follow. The exercise was considered a success by those involved, but it was recognized that a repeat performance in the future might not be so likely without the same factors in their favor. Out of this exercise came a list of recommended priority groups from the civilian occupational population to be inoculated in the event of an emergency.

In 1954, the Armed Forces initiated routine annual vaccination against the flu, considered the "only really effective measure available in combating" the virus, but the Public Health Service did not recommend a comparable regimen to the general public. This was based on the relatively short-lived demonstrated immunity of the vaccines and the lack of certainty that the strains used in the polyvalent vaccines then would be the cause of epidemics in the future. However, this policy would be reexamined in light of the pandemic three years later.

==== Pandemic vaccine ====
===== United States =====
After reading of the epidemic underway in Hong Kong, Maurice Hilleman immediately sent for samples of the virus from patients in the Far East, which were collected in late April 1957 and received at the Walter Reed Army Institute of Research before the middle of May. The Division of Biologics Standards of the US Public Health Service released the first of the virus cultures, designated A/Jap/305/57, to vaccine manufacturers on 12 May 1957. An immediate issue encountered with the new variant was in choosing the isolate optimally adaptable to producing necessary virus growth in chick embryos. After study of the five isolates in total, it was concluded that none in particular would be chosen for production, but each manufacturer would use whichever isolate showed the best growth characteristics.

Hilleman's team reported its finding of the antigenic novelty of the virus on 22 May after working "around the clock" for the last five days. Hilleman predicted an epidemic would strike the US when schools reopened in the fall.

The Public Health Service formally began its participation in the effort against the flu on 29 May with a meeting with the Surgeons General of the military. The nature of the disease was discussed, and it was recommended that the Department of Defense purchase about 3 million doses of monovalent vaccine targeting the pandemic virus. The Commission on Influenza was asked to propose the composition of the polyvalent vaccine to be used as well. The following day, Justin M. Andrews, Director of NIH, having consulted with CDC Director Robert J. Anderson, submitted a memo that recommended, among other items, that the monovalent pandemic vaccine needed for the Department of Defense be licensed.

On the last day of May, reflecting upon the experience of the 1918 pandemic, Acting Surgeon General W.P. Dearing indicated his support for a mass immunization program, if epidemiologists were to find the present situation "unusual or almost unique", in which case the burden of proof would shift to opponents of such a program. He asked the principal staff officers of the Office of the Surgeon General to explore whether "the investment of the few million dollars necessary" to organize an immunization campaign would be advisable, if the situation indeed justified it.

Vaccine production was underway before the start of June. After receiving its samples on 23 May, for example, Merck Sharp & Dohme had produced "laboratory quantities" of pandemic vaccine within two weeks. Before the middle of June, the first experimental lots had been produced and promptly entered into testing at the National Institutes of Health, which was expected to take about two weeks. The first 90 volunteers from among PHS personnel were inoculated with the experimental vaccine on 18 June.

On 5 June, the Assistant to the Surgeon General called a meeting with representatives of the three bureaus of the Service. The associate director of NIH reported that the technical problem in the production of the monovalent vaccine had been resolved and that it could be ready in September, with a polyvalent vaccine including the novel strain ready a month later. He advised that certain groups receive the monovalent vaccine at the same time as the Armed Forces, basing his priorities on the list produced following the 1951 exercise. It was made clear that this would not require any additional funding. The deputy chief of the Bureau of State Services then recommended that the Surgeon General form an advisory council of public health officials, physicians, and the manufacturers; his vision was one of the Public Health Service advocating for mass inoculation, which would necessitate extra funds.

The first meeting of the Advisory Committee on Influenza occurred on 10 June. One general finding of this meeting was that since limited data suggested the existing polyvalent vaccine was not protective against the novel variant, an effective monovalent vaccine should be produced immediately. Existing polyvalent vaccine should be utilized as otherwise recommended. Furthermore, the present situation did not yet justify establishing priorities for civilian use or considering any federal subsidy in producing the vaccine. Following this meeting, Surgeon General Burney held a press conference, where he discussed the vaccine. He shared the Department of Defense's consideration of purchasing 4 million doses of the monovalent vaccine—enough to vaccinate the entire Armed Forces, estimated at 2.8 million. He made clear that production of the monovalent vaccine would occupy the manufacturers, and so they would not be able to produce both the monovalent and the polyvalent vaccines at the same time. He also shared the committee's recommendation that if only 4 million doses could be produced over the next six weeks, they should go to the Armed Forces.

The second phase of the Public Health Service's Asian Influenza Program began with a meeting of technical representatives of the manufacturers with NIH on 12 June. The manufacturers were presented with the latest epidemiological information, including data on the virus isolates and their growth characteristics. Here each company's experience with the different strains used in production was also summarized, and they ultimately agreed to review their inventories and report a potential formula that would make best use of available materials. This same day, the State of New York announced its plan to start a pilot project to produce pandemic vaccine, authorized by Governor W. Averell Harriman.

On 20 June, an associate director of NIH laid out various alternatives for the course of the virus in the US and how to respond to each: an explosive outbreak before 1 September, with either continued low mortality or increased virulence (vaccination would not be possible, except for the use of limited polyvalent vaccine supplies and possible use in 1958); sporadic local activity during the summer with an explosive outbreak in the winter, again with low mortality (vaccinate priority groups) or increased virulence (maximize vaccine production, vaccination would be required, and priority groups would receive it first); or sporadic local activity during the summer with normal incidence in the winter (no recommendation of vaccination). It was generally agreed that the most likely outcome would be closer to the second possibility, with sporadic local activity during the summer with an epidemic in the fall or winter, with little increase in lethality. It was also clear then that the quantities of vaccine necessary for large-scale inoculation would not be ready until after the middle of August, but if the epidemic held off until the fall and winter, as was considered likely, it would be possible protect a significant part of the population. This framework was later presented to the Secretary of Health, Education, and Welfare on 24 June.

On 26 June, Burney met with representatives of the American Medical Association to discuss the virus and how best to employ medical manpower against a serious epidemic. The vaccination situation was also discussed, as well as the variety of federal responses envisioned by the Service. Although it was emphasized that the present situation did not appear to justify large-scale orders or subsidization of production by the federal government, the parties agreed up a partnership between the Public Health Service and the American Medical Association with the purpose of public health education. It was recognized that the public had heard much about the novel virus but had not heard a thing about how to protect itself against it.

In 1957, six pharmaceutical companies were licensed to manufacture influenza vaccine: Merck Sharpe & Dohme, Eli Lilly & Co., Parke, Davis & Co., Pitman-Moore Co., National Drug Company, and Lederle Laboratories. As members of the pharmaceutical industry, they had participated in the effort since the day the Public Health Service sent them samples of the virus. Maurice Hilleman happened to be close to the industry, and he helped secure the initial involvement of the manufacturers, going to them directly to spur development and avoiding "the bureaucratic red tape" that might typically forestall manufacture of new pharmaceutical products. In the latter half of June, following a series of outbreaks of the novel virus aboard naval vessels docked on the East Coast, the Department of Defense provided a significant stimulus to commercial production by placing an order for 2,650,000 ml of monovalent vaccine.

After Merck's production of "laboratory quantities" of vaccine by early June and the product's entry into clinical trials in the middle of June, initial batches from four other manufacturers, including Pitman-Moore Co. and Eli Lilly & Co., were sent to NIH in early July. By this time, Pitman-Moore had received a government contract for about half a million doses while Eli Lilly had not, though Lilly confirmed it would be moving ahead with production on a "preparedness basis".

The Public Health Service announced the establishment of specifications in the manufacture of the pandemic vaccine, which were then sent to the manufacturers, on 10 July. Service officials that day also met with the executive committee of the Association of State and Territorial Health Officers in Washington, D.C., where the flu situation was discussed. The officers agreed with the proposed PHS–AMA partnership to launch a public health education campaign, specifically one that urged vaccination against the flu. At this time, influenza vaccines had generally been used by large companies to protect their employees, but with the threat of a probable, large-scale outbreak, stimulating their broader use seemed advisable.

With the middle of July came the need finally to make two key policy decisions: whether to recommend vaccination again the flu for the general public and whether to recommend to the manufacturers to continue production of the monovalent vaccine then intended only for military use or to recommend they shift to making a polyvalent vaccine incorporating the novel variant for use by the general public. As to the first question, such a recommendation was considered medically justified, but the necessary quantities of vaccine had never been produced so quickly. Beyond providing for its own employees and patients, PHS ruled out any purchasing of vaccine itself. To the end of ensuring adequate supply for the general public, Burney spoke to each of the manufacturers by telephone from 15 July through 19 July. They could see the need, "from the standpoint of public health", to vaccinate as much as one-third of the population, and given the predictions of an epidemic and the plans already being developed by public health officials, they agreed to make a sizable investment in vaccine production without any aid from the federal government.

As to the second question, NIH believed that a polyvalent vaccine was preferable immunologically speaking, but the manufacturers were unsure they could produce large amounts of an effective polyvalent vaccine on the timeline envisioned. On the other hand, a monovalent vaccine would become preferable if the virus itself were to become significantly deadlier. Therefore, the wisest recommendation seemed to be for a monovalent vaccine for use by the general public once the needs of the Armed Forces had been satisfied.

Burney ultimately made these decisions, but they were not necessarily set in stone. With the unpredictability of influenza well recognized, it was considered judicious to "hedge" any policy in favor of reducing a potential rise in mortality, were it to occur. The Division of Biologics Standards therefore outlined a set of facilities that could be used to shore up production if the situation worsened. A mandatory allocation system for distribution and appropriation of funds for the purchase of vaccine and for public vaccination clinics were considered feasible if circumstances ultimately justified them.

The vaccine entered trials at Fort Ord on 26 July and Lowry Air Force Base on 29 July.

At the beginning of August, PHS gave the go-ahead to the press to initiate its public health education campaign. Burney met with press to warn of "the very definite probability" of a widespread epidemic in the fall or winter. He shared that the manufacturers had agreed to working "triple shifts", every day of the week, to produce 8 million doses by the middle of September, of which half would go to the Armed Forces. The ultimate target was 60 million doses by 1 February. It was made clear that there would not be enough time to produce enough vaccine to inoculate a majority of the country before the flu season, but vaccination, as "the only known preventive" against the flu, was viewed as the best course of action. When asked about the potential for mass immunization programs like those against polio, Burney stated that these would be the states' responsibility, but he conceded that "you could probably get more immunized in a shorter period" that way. The principal reason against such a policy was, apparently, that "that isn't the ordinary way we do things in this country."

On 2 August, representatives of the Armed Forces, the Veterans Administration, and PHS met to discuss the question of vaccine dosage. It was the opinion of the Office of the Surgeon General, upon review of studies thus far reported, that 1 cc (cubic centimeter) of monovalent vaccine, with a strength of 200 CCA units, would be "the most effective and practical dosage". This was five times the strength of the pilot vaccine initially announced on 10 July. This potency was selected in light of difficulties during the early-summer trials in obtaining high yields of the virus in embryonated eggs, with any strength greater than 200 CCA seeming unlikely.

On 9 August, Burney recommended to the Office of the Surgeon General that export of the pandemic vaccine be controlled while supplies were limited. The next day, PHS announced its plans for a "nationwide battle" against the anticipated flu outbreak that fall and winter. Beginning in September, a mass education campaign would call for the public to get vaccinated through various media such as the press, radio, and television.

On 12 August, Burney sent individual letters to each of the manufacturers requesting their cooperation with PHS in a "voluntary system of equitable interstate allocations" of the pandemic vaccine while supplies remained limited. They all agreed. This plan was later announced on 16 August, with the purpose of such a system being to ensure "an equitable availability of vaccine supplies throughout all parts of the country". The manufacturers were acknowledged as having "informally" shown a willingness to follow the system while vaccine remained scarce. In short, each state would receive shipments of a fraction of a lot of vaccine from each manufacturer equal to the proportion of that state's population to the population of the entire country. Burney emphasized that the Service "would not contemplate any allocation between public agency purchasers and commercial sales."

The first lot of 502,000 doses of vaccines was released on 12 August. Almost immediately, issues with allocation became glaringly obvious. In Washington, D.C., physicians reported of an intensely worried public, asking more about the "Asiatic flu" than any other epidemic disease that any could recall. They feared that such pressure might bring about a black market around the vaccine (though Daniel L. Finucane, Director of the District Department of Health, doubted such a possibility). Nonetheless, Time reported that National Drug Co. and Lederle Laboratories had sent their initial doses to companies across the country, leaving it to them to distribute the shots, and that indeed individual doctors had begun vaccinating "favored patients". At the same time, the NFL's Chicago Cardinals were able to announce that the entire team would be vaccinated against the flu.

The pandemic vaccine became relevant for the Eisenhower administration not long after the first doses were released. White House Press Secretary James Hagerty would report that two doses had been sent to Secretary of the Interior Fred A. Seaton by PHS. However, Seaton decided beginning his inoculation was not necessary before his trip to Hawaii. On 21 August, a spokesperson for the Department of Agriculture had to deny the speculation that the use of millions of eggs necessary for vaccine production would "skyrocket" the price of eggs. That same day, President Eisenhower was asked whether he would receive the pandemic vaccine. He replied, "I am going to take it just as soon as ordinary people like I am can get it."

Eisenhower later met with his chief economic advisor, Gabriel Hauge. On 22 August, Hauge was sent home ill. That same day, Burney stated that the president was "an essential person" and should get vaccinated immediately, a recommendation with which Eisenhower's personal physician, Major General Howard McCrum Snyder, "agreed completely". On 24 August, Burney made the pointed recommendation that those with a history of heart or lung conditions be vaccinated early. (Eisenhower had suffered a heart attack in September 1955.) Notably, he assured Snyder that there was sufficient vaccine in the district to cover this priority group. Finally, based on Burney's recommendation the preceding weekend, Eisenhower was vaccinated on 26 August, the injection administered by Snyder. Hagerty reported that all members of the White House who worked closely with the president would thereafter be vaccinated.

That same week, the Association of State and Territorial Health Officers convened in Bethesda, Maryland, and Washington, D.C., beginning on 27 August for a two-day special meeting to discuss the pandemic response. Among other recommendations pertaining to preparing for a likely epidemic, the Committee on Vaccination Promotion outlined how such programs should be carried out and who should be prioritized for inoculation. The primary objective for any such program was considered "to prevent illness and death from epidemic influenza within the limits of available vaccine." The committee sided with PHS's informal agreement with the manufacturers that they participate in a "voluntary" system of interstate allocation. It was plainly acknowledged that "influenza vaccine is being manufactured and will becoming increasingly available but is not yet available for everyone"; therefore, PHS would recommend to civilian physicians that they prioritize those working in essential services maintaining the health of the community, those maintaining other basic services, and those considered to be at "special medical risk". It was stated that the pandemic vaccine had been approved for use in children as young as three months, with the following recommendations for administration: Children three months to five years of age would receive a two-dose regimen of 0.1 cc each, spaced over one to two weeks; children five to 12 years of age would receive a similar two-dose regimen but of 0.5 cc each; and children 13 years of age and older would receive the same dosage as for adults, a single, 1.0-cc injection. Finally, it was resolved that the two vaccination programs, that against polio and now that against influenza, "be continued as independent and parallel programs."

The second lot of 562,610 doses was released on 28 August, bringing the total to 1,149,610 doses for both military and civilian use. Burney shared the expectation that, based on the current pace of production, it was possible that 80 to 85 million doses would be ready by 1 January, 20 million doses more and one month sooner than originally anticipated. The Armed Forces announced their intention to give two injections to each servicemember, and thus their order had increased from 4 million doses to over 7 million.

Just as after release of the first batch of vaccine, issues with supply and allocation quickly became apparent yet again. Although authorities like the New York County Medical Society and wholesalers in Washington, D.C., made clear that vaccine would not be available for the public until September or even October, there was still intense demand for the vaccine. A physician's secretary in the district reported in The Evening Star that her office was receiving "dozens" of calls every day from anxious patients. This was not helped by Burney's statement days before, that there was sufficient vaccine in the district to vaccinate those with heart and lung conditions, such as the president. Even the State Department had not received any vaccine, and it was reportedly unknown when it would. Interestingly, in contrast to the D.C. situation, doctors in New York City reported that they had been asked about the vaccine, but the pressure was nowhere near that for the Salk polio vaccine when it had been in short supply.

On 31 August, a spokesperson for National Drug stated that D.C. physicians had been "very well taken care of" with respect to vaccine. Finucane, the district health director, immediately pushed back on this claim, saying that he knew of "no large shipments of the vaccine into Washington" and that those who had received any were "lucky". Meanwhile, the pharmaceutical company had been very responsive to the demands of industrial concerns such as Bell Telephone, E. I. duPont de Nemours & Co., Inc., and Pennsylvania Railroad. One district physician decried this state of affairs as "grossly unfair"; similarly, Dr. I. Phillips Frohman, a former chairman within the American Medical Association, labeled it "criminal". However, the company defended its distribution practices by asserting it was "trying to get as much of the vaccine out as possible."

Ironically, The Star's reporting on National Drug's statement regarding vaccine supply and Finucane's pushback, with the headline "Doctors Here Receive Vaccine for Patients", seemed to stimulate demand even more, according to physicians. J. Hunter Stewart, chief of the Information Office of the Office of the Surgeon General, clarified that there was no federal priority system beyond PHS's recommendations that the vaccine be distributed equitably and that it first go to healthcare providers. He emphasized: "But you must remember that these are recommendations."

This insistence upon the voluntary nature of vaccine allocation was not satisfying to all. On 3 September, Dr. Thomas E. Mattingly wrote into The Star to thank it for debunking National Drug's statement and to discuss the situation in general. He described PHS's establishment of a system of priorities as "very wise" but asserted that it was "not enough to panic the public and not provide dependable discipline and guarantee a system of priorities". He called on the federal government to "accept both responsibility and purposeful leadership" and PHS to seize every last dose of vaccine and distribute it itself. The government would also reimburse the companies "for the fair cost of all vaccine they have been urged to manufacture." Others echoed this call for some "special action of one vague kind or another" by the federal government, just as had been advocated for during the early days of the Salk vaccine.

On 4 September, PHS officially announced the system of allocation agreed to by the manufacturers, which would allocate vaccine supplies to states in proportion to their population, though it made clear that the program would not retroactively apply to any allotments of vaccine already shipped to fill military or civilian orders. The Service also emphatically reiterated that the allocation plan was "strictly voluntary".

On 5 September, the week-long eighth session of the Regional Committee for the Western Pacific of the World Health Organization commenced in Hong Kong. Burney, the elected vice chairman for the session, gave a progress report on the pandemic response in the United States, including the vaccine situation, in which he stated his expectation that 85 million doses would be ready in order to combat the epidemic. That same day, PHS announced the release of a further 1,028,295 doses, entirely for civilian use, in addition to the 3,705,770 doses already released.

As the vaccine began to be rolled out "in quantity", so too did the nationwide incidence of influenza begin to rise with the reopening of schools. On 18 September, PHS reported that vaccine production had fallen short of the original expectation of 8 million doses by the middle of the month, with only 5,430,442 having been released by that point. The release of another 1,526,590 doses that week, however, brought the total to 6,957,032. Despite this shortfall, the Service estimated that 12.2 million doses would still be produced by the end of September. This goal proved feasible as production increased, and a total of 13,504,947 doses were ultimately released through 1 October.

Although vaccine was, at this point, being rolled out at a faster pace than expected, the issue of exact allocation persisted. On 7 October, Time reported that most supplies had seemingly "been sold to anyone who went after [the vaccine] early and energetically"; this included, in particular, "football teams and business concerns." As a result, the San Francisco 49ers and the football teams of Stanford and the University of California had received inoculations, as had employees of Dun & Bradstreet and the Retail Credit Co. (today Equifax); many essential workers in at least a dozen cities, on the other hand, received none. The agreement between PHS and the manufacturers on a "voluntary" system of allocation, in other words, "was generally ignored." On 24 September, PHS announced that it had requested, more specifically, that the vaccine manufacturers fill orders in accordance with state and local priority recommendations, in addition to the population-based system of allocation.

Confusion surrounding vaccination priorities plagued even federal agencies. In October, The Evening Star reported of a "major foul-up" in the provision of vaccine to government employees. The Civil Service Commission, among some other agencies, had been inoculating any who applied, while others, such as the Commerce Department, had been giving vaccine only to those deemed "essential", such as air traffic controllers within the Civil Air Administration. The director of personnel at the Commerce Department, Carlton Hayward, expressed plainly that the process had been "handled sloppily". Hayward's assistant, John S. Myers, suggested two items to improve the allocation policy—"clearcut guidance" on this issue from PHS and specification as to whether federal agencies could use vaccine funding for those other than essential workers—noting that doing so could well save money on sick leave.

Similar criticisms were echoed across the country, even as the pace of production continued to accelerate. In Boston, city councilors charged that a "lack of leadership" on the part of state and federal health authorities had created a "black market" for the vaccine, with some doctors allegedly charging "exorbitant amounts" for shots. In California, testifying before the subcommittee on intergovernmental affairs in the State Assembly, Director of the Department of Public Health Malcolm Merrill expressed his view that insufficient planning had gone into the system of allocation based on state population. Neither were the manufacturers themselves spared of criticism for their part in this vaccine "black market": After the Queens County Medical Society contacted several of the companies to protest their "maldistribution" of vaccine to such nonessential recipients as "banks, candy stores, hair net factories, etc.", the firms reportedly could offer nothing in response but "very evasive answers" and "vague explanations".

With flu cases having peaked, and excess mortality at this point increasing, in the latter half of October, PHS announced the development of a more "potent" vaccine to be available by the end of November. Vaccine remained scarce in many places by the end of October, while in others supply had improved. In Oklahoma City for a water pollution control meeting, Burney provided the expectation that the epidemic would continue for 8 to 10 weeks and recommended that people should take the improved vaccine when it was available but that they should not wait if they were able to take the currently available vaccine.

By early November, estimated flu cases had reached 6 million while mortality peaked during the first week of the month. Cities like Philadelphia and Washington, D.C., continued to urge those not yet inoculated to get the vaccine, at this point, in part, in an effort to ward off a potential second wave. On 8 November, with over 40 million doses released thus far, PHS announced an end to the voluntary allocation program; distributors were now free to send vaccine supplies to areas of high demand rather than attempt an equitable allocation. At the 85th annual meeting of the American Public Health Association on 14 November, PHS information chief J. Hunter Stewart addressed the vaccine situation, reporting that the time of demand exceeding supply had ended in many places and would soon end in all places across the country.

With the epidemic declining in most places by early December, demand for the vaccine began to decline as well, leaving behind a considerable surplus, and manufacturers began to cut back on production. By 11 December, over 54 million doses had been released. Despite improving conditions, Burney urged continued vaccination given the possibility for another, even more severe wave later in the winter, and noted that the estimated 22 million to 25 million doses still on the way would be sufficient to control any new outbreaks until production could restart. After influenza and pneumonia mortality began to increase again in January 1958, Burney called for a second round of injections for older individuals and others in high-risk groups.

Overall, this vaccination effort was considered to be a "gamble". The industry as a whole invested $20 million in production, without any subsidization by the government and with no guarantee, other than assurances from PHS, that there would be demand for the vaccine. Despite the drop in demand and the subsequent surplus as the epidemic waned, several of the manufacturers expressed little concern regarding the financial situation. Although vaccine sales had been, according to Eli Lilly & Co., "disappointing", Lederle Laboratories, for example, reported in December that the slump in sales would have little effect on their overall earnings for 1957. Parke, Davis & Co. expressed a similar sentiment, noting that the high levels of respiratory illness stimulated a significant demand for the company's other products, such as cough medicine and antibiotics.

It is questionable how effective the campaign was on the whole in altering the course of the epidemic. On account of the delays in distribution, many fewer individuals actually received the vaccine than the approximately 49 million doses that had been released by the peak of the epidemic. Considering the time needed to build up antibodies following vaccination, the number of individuals "effectively immunized" was considered to be "relatively small." Reflecting on lessons learned from this episode, PHS acknowledged after the fact that "a more coherent system of allocation" would be necessary, particularly when demand far exceeds available supply.

=== Post-pandemic ===
The number of deaths peaked the week ending 17 October, with 600 reported in England and Wales. The vaccine was available in the same month in the United Kingdom. Although it was initially available only in limited quantities, its rapid deployment helped contain the pandemic. Hilleman's vaccine is believed to have saved hundreds of thousands of lives. Some predicted that the US death toll would have reached 1 million without the vaccine that Hilleman called for.

H2N2 influenza virus continued to be transmitted until 1968, when it transformed via antigenic shift into influenza A virus subtype H3N2, the cause of the 1968 influenza pandemic.

== Virology and clinical data ==
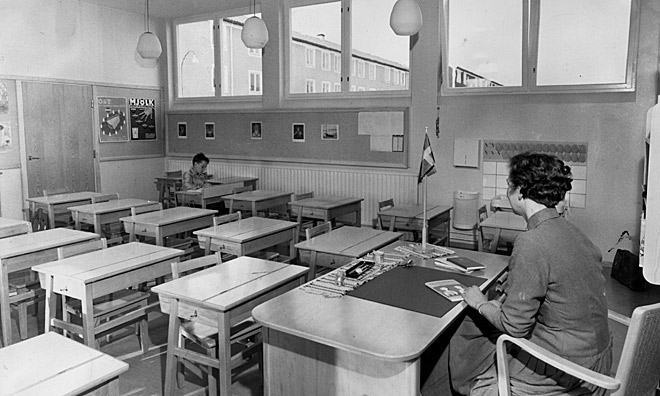
At Vivallius School in Örebro, Sweden, only one student attended class due to the pandemic.

The strain of virus that caused the Asian flu pandemic, influenza A virus subtype H2N2, was a recombination of avian influenza (probably from geese) and human influenza viruses. As it was a novel strain of the virus, the population had minimal immunity. The reproduction number for the virus was around 1.8 and approximately two-thirds of infected individuals were estimated to have experienced clinical symptoms.

It could cause pneumonia by itself without the presence of secondary bacterial infection. It caused many infections in children, spread in schools, and led to many school closures. However, the virus was rarely fatal in children and was most deadly in pregnant women, the elderly, and those with pre-existing heart and lung disease.

== Mortality estimates ==
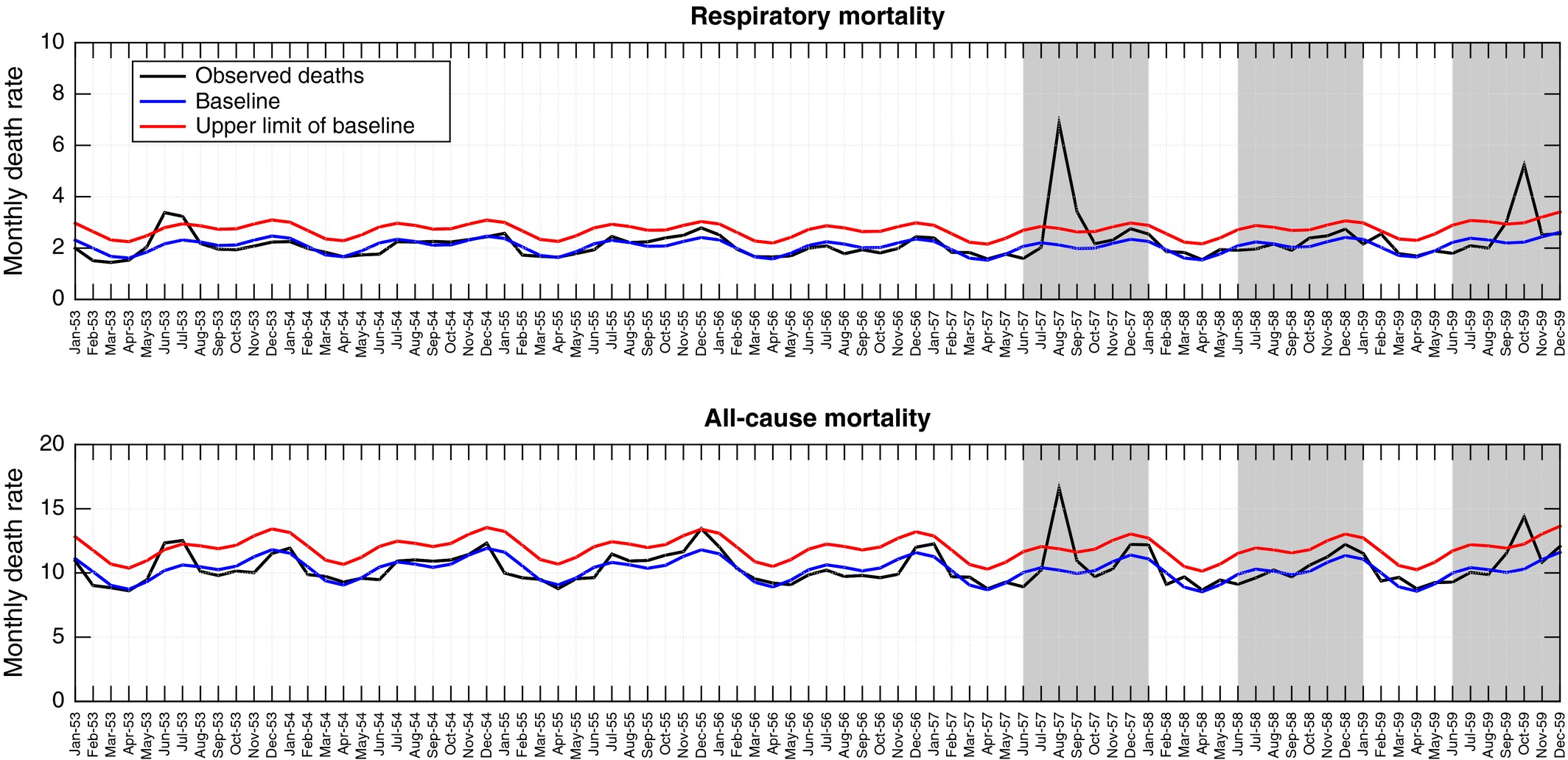
Excess mortality in Chile, 1953–1959. Flu seasons highlighted in gray. Note black spikes in the mortality rate.

In October 1957, US Surgeon General Leroy E. Burney told The New York Times that the pandemic is mild and the case fatality rate (CFR) is below "two-thirds of 1 per cent", or less than 0.67%. After the pandemic, information from 29 general practices in the UK estimated 2.3 deaths per 1,000 medically attended cases. A survey based on randomly selected families in Kolkata, India, revealed that there were 1,055 deaths in 1,496,000 cases. On the symposium of Asian influenza in 1958, a range of CFR from 0.01% to 0.33% was provided, most frequently in between 0.02% and 0.05%. More recently, the World Health Organization estimated the CFR of Asian flu to be lower than 0.2%. In the US pandemic preparedness plan, the CDC estimated the CFR of 1957 pandemic to be 0.1%. The estimated CFR from first wave morbidity and excess mortality in Norway is in between 0.04% and 0.11%. Other scholars estimated the CFR near 0.1%.

Most estimates of excessive deaths due to the pandemic range from 1 to 4 million, some of which include years beyond 1958. In particular, the attempt by the National Institutes of Health in 2016 attributed global mortality 1.1 million (0.7 to 1.5 million) excess deaths to the pandemic, including the year 1959. This estimate of global burden has recently been adopted by the World Health Organization and US CDC. The study also estimated the excess deaths in the first year of the pandemic, in 1957, to be 0.6 million (0.4 to 0.8 million).

=== By country ===
- According to the US CDC, two estimates of excess deaths, 70,000 and 116,000, are provided. The first estimate refers to the 1957–1958 flu season while the higher estimate is multi-year totals from 1957 to 1960.
- An estimated 33,000 deaths in the United Kingdom were attributed to the 1957–1958 flu outbreak. The disease was estimated to have a 3% rate of complications and 0.3% mortality in the United Kingdom.
- An estimated 40,000 deaths in France were attributed to the 1957–1958 flu outbreak.
- In West Germany, around 30,000 people died of the flu between September 1957 and April 1958.
- According to a 2016 study in The Journal of Infectious Diseases, the highest excess mortality occurred in Latin America.

== Economic effects ==
The Dow Jones Industrial Average lost 15% of its value in the second half of 1957, and the US experienced a recession. In the United Kingdom, the government paid out £10 million in sickness benefit, and some factories and mines had to close. Many schools had to close in Ireland, including seventeen in Dublin.
