= Keiji Fukuda =

Japanese-American epidemiologist

- 福田 敬二
- Born: 1955; Tokyo, Japan
- Education: Oberlin College (BA); University of Vermont (MD); University of California, Berkeley (MPH)
- Known for: Influenza research
- Spouse: Holly Fukuda
- Children: 2
- Parent(s): David Minoru Fukuda; Michiko Fukuda
- Scientific career
- Fields: Epidemiology
- Institutions: University of Hong Kong; World Health Organization; Centers for Disease Control and Prevention

Keiji Fukuda (福田 敬二, Fukuda Keiji; born 1955) is a Japanese-American physician and epidemiologist, specializing in influenza epidemiology. He was an Assistant Director-General of the World Health Organization (WHO) from 2009 to 2016, and the Director of the School of Public Health at the University of Hong Kong (HKU) between 2017 and 2021.

== Early life and education ==
Fukuda was born in Tokyo, Japan, to a physician family. His parents were physicians; his father, David Minoru Fukuda, was an anesthesiologist and his mother, Michiko Fukuda (née Nakamura) was an obstetrician-gynecologist, although she did not practice in the United States. The Fukudas immigrated from Japan to Vermont in 1955, and the senior Fukuda started practicing anesthesiology in Barre, Vermont, in 1957. Fukuda's mother died in 1993 and his father in 2006. Fukuda's older sister, Mariko, is a teacher and his younger brother, Christopher, is a urologist.

At the urging of one of his high school teachers, Fukuda went to Oberlin College in 1973 for undergraduate studies, finishing in 1978. Initially reluctant to follow in the family footsteps and hoping to become a filmmaker, he eventually pursued medicine at the University of Vermont College of Medicine (now Robert Larner College of Medicine), obtaining his MD degree in 1984.

He stayed in Tamil Nadu in South India for 6 months between his second and third year at medical school, working with indigenous tribes. It confirmed his interest in international medicine. He next completed his internal medicine residency and then a chief residency at Mount Zion Hospital (now part of the UCSF Medical Center) in San Francisco. Fukuda entered the University of California, Berkeley in 1988 and obtained a Master of Public Health (MPH) in epidemiology 1 year later.

== Career ==
External videos
- Speech by Keiji Fukuda at "Breaking Through Influenza Information Walls" by GISAID, Bonn, Germany, 2011
- Interview with Keiji Fukuda: H7N9 virus 'one of the most lethal so far', CNN, 2013
- Interview with Keiji Fukuda: Ebola response needs to "scale up", CBS News, 2015

After completing his MPH, Fukuda worked in San Francisco Bay Area in clinics that focus on leprosy and tuberculosis, and then moved to Atlanta, Georgia, where he spent 2 years studying in the Epidemic Intelligence Service (EIS) program at the Centers for Disease Control and Prevention (CDC).

Fukuda joined the Viral Exanthems and Herpesvirus Branch at CDC after finishing the EIS program. Because of the idea that chronic fatigue syndrome was related to chronic infections of herpesvirus, this group was also responsible for this disease. In 1994, Fukuda led a committee that revised the definition of the disease, which has since become the most widely used clinical and research definition of the illness.

In 1996, Fukuda became the chief of the Epidemiology and Prevention Branch at the CDC Influenza Division, after the Division approached him. In this position, he has led investigations into outbreaks of avian flu, including the one in 1997 in Hong Kong and another in 2004 in Vietnam. He was on the WHO expert panel investigating the 2003 SARS outbreak in China.

Fukuda joined the WHO in 2005 and became a scientist at the Global Influenza Program, and was promoted to coordinator in 2006 and director in 2008. In 2007, while serving at the WHO, Fukuda warned that another influenza pandemic was almost certain in the long-term future and emphasized the need for international preparedness against emerging avian influenza strains such as H5N1. In March 2009, Fukuda was appointed WHO Assistant Director-General ad interim for Health Security and Environment. The media referred to him as the WHO "flu chief" during the 2009 swine flu pandemic, when he was the face of the WHO to the media. He admitted the communication from the WHO during the pandemic was inadequate. He was also the Special Adviser on Pandemic Influenza to the Director-General throughout the pandemic, from October 2009 to August 2010.

Fukuda officially became the Assistant Director-General for Health Security and Environment in 2010, until 2015 when he switched to the role of Assistant Director-General and Special Representative of the Director General for Antimicrobial Resistance.

In December 2016, Fukuda joined the School of Public Health at Li Ka Shing Faculty of Medicine, University of Hong Kong, as clinical professor, and also took up the position of School Director the next year. During the COVID-19 pandemic, he was one of four government advisors and often gave global and local media interviews.

In October 2020, HKU reportedly would not renew his contract after it expired at the end of 2021, citing Fukuda's age has passed the university retirement age of 60. However, there were news that Fukuda has passed university's academic review, but the President and Vice-chancellor Xiang Zhang vetoed the renewal, as he did not meet the requirement of "top academic achievement". He left the government COVID-19 expert panel on December 1, and HKU on December 8, 2021, moving back to Atlanta, Georgia for retirement.

== Personal life ==
Fukuda backpacked for nine months after his second year at the University of Vermont, traveling across Asia, the Middle East and Western Europe. He realized his love for traveling, and for "actually [doing] something", instead of simply being a tourist. Fukuda was married in 1990. He and his wife, Holly, have 2 daughters.
