= List of seasonal influenza vaccines =

Seasonal influenza vaccine brands include Fluzone/Fluzone Quadrivalent and Vaxigrip/VaxigripTetra, Influvac and Optaflu.

== AstraZeneca ==
Fluenz, Flumist and their quadrivalent formulations are nasal attenuated vaccines by AstraZeneca.

- Fluenz
- Fluenz Tetra
- Flumist
- Flumist Quadrivalent

== GlaxoSmithKline ==
Fluarix, Flulaval and their quadrivalent formulations are split virus inactivated vaccines by GlaxoSmithKline.

- Fluarix
- Flulaval
- Fluarix Tetra

== Mylan/Viatris ==
Influvac and its quadrivalent formulation are surface antigen subunit vaccines marketed by Mylan.

- Influvac
- Influvac Tetra

They contain inactivated purified surface fragments (subunits) from the three different strains of the influenza virus (A/H1N1, A/H3N2, and Influenza B virus) that are selected and distributed by the World Health Organization, on the basis of their latest recommendations. Previously, they were produced and marketed by Abbott Laboratories

In February 2010, Abbott acquired the vaccines subunit from Solvay Pharmaceuticals included in its $6.2 billion purchase and the subunit influenza vaccine — Influvac has been commercially available on the market since the early nineteen-eighties. With the acquisition of Solvay, Abbott retained access to the Eastern European, Middle Eastern & Latin American markets. Approximately $850 million of sales revenue from vaccines was reported by Solvay Pharmaceuticals in 2009.

In February 2015, Mylan Laboratories completed the deal with Abbott to purchase Abbott's generic drugs business in developed markets, which includes Influvac.

In some countries, Influvac is marketed by Viatris after Upjohn merged with Mylan to create Viatris.

== Novartis ==
- Optaflu was a trivalent surface antigen inactivated vaccine, the first flu vaccine made in mammalian cell cultures rather than chicken eggs, manufactured by Novartis.

In April 2007, Novartis received a positive opinion supporting European Union approval of Optaflu. In 2014, Novartis' flu vaccine unit was sold to CSL Limited, and placed under CSL subsidiary, bioCSL (Seqirus) as marketing authorization holder. In 2017, bioCSL decided to discontinue the usage of the Optaflu brand for commercial reasons.

== Sanofi-Aventis ==
Vaxigrip Tetra and Fluquadri are quadrivalent split virus inactivated vaccines by Sanofi-Aventis.

- Vaxigrip Tetra
- Fluquadri

== Sanofi Pasteur ==
Sanofi Pasteur produces the following vaccines:

- Fluzone
- Vaxigrip/Vaxigrip Tetra
- Flublok
- Supemtek/Supemtek Tetra

=== Fluzone ===
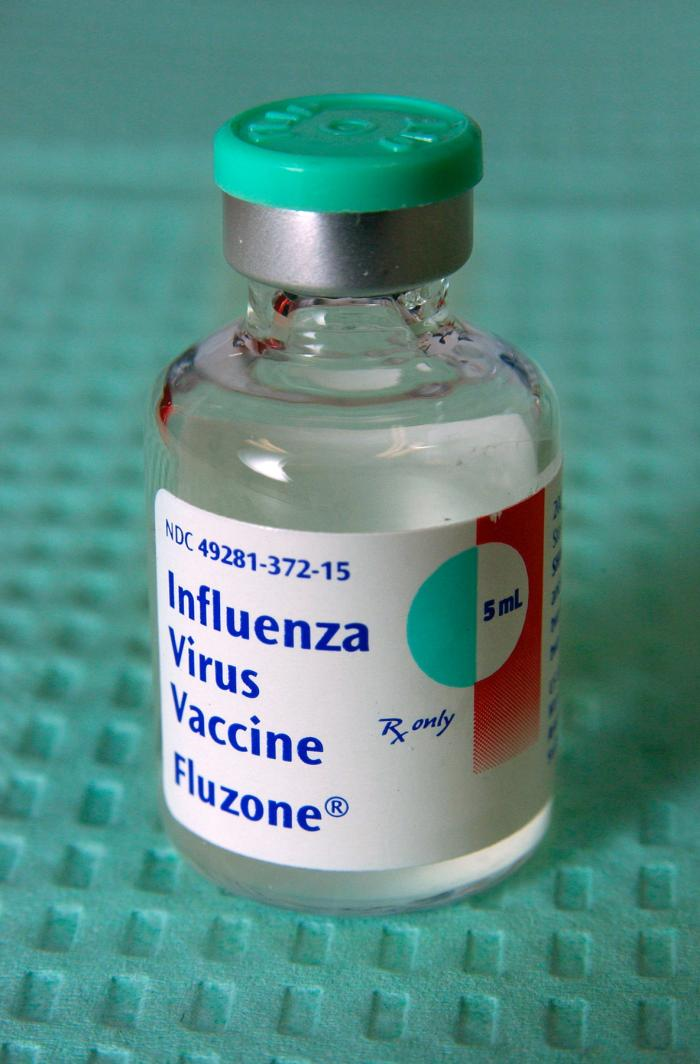
A 5cc vial of Fluzone

Fluzone and its quadrivalent formulation are split virus inactivated vaccines distributed by Sanofi Pasteur mainly in the United States.

==== Dosage and storage ====
Fluzone is typically administered in a single dose by intramuscular injection; an intradermal injection is also available. It is presented as a 0.25 ml syringe for pediatric use, as a 0.5 ml syringe for adults and children, as a 0.5 ml vial for adults and children, and as a 5 ml vial for adults and children. Fluzone must be refrigerated under temperatures from 2 to 8 °C (36 to 46 °F) and is inactivated by freezing. Fluzone was initially approved in 1980 by the FDA.

==== Adverse effects ====
The following adverse effects have been reported:

- Mild soreness, local pain and swelling at the site of the injection
- In small children and in people with no previous exposure to a flu vaccine, episodes of fever, malaise, myalgia (muscle pain)
- In people who are sensitive to egg protein, allergic reactions may ensue, such as hives, angioedema, asthma and anaphylaxis

==== High-dose vaccine ====
A high-dose vaccine (Fluzone High-Dose) four times the strength of standard flu vaccine was approved by the FDA in 2009. This vaccine is intended for people 65 and over, who typically have weakened immune response due to normal aging. The vaccine produces a greater immune response than standard vaccine. According to the CDC, "a study published in the New England Journal of Medicine [in August, 2014] indicated that the high-dose vaccine was 24.2% more effective in preventing flu in adults 65 years of age and older relative to a standard-dose vaccine." The CDC recommends the high-dose vaccine for people 65 and over but expresses no preference between it and standard vaccine. Further studies were underway as of 2014.

=== Vaxigrip/Vaxigrip Tetra ===
Vaxigrip and its quadrivalent formulation Vaxigrip Tetra are split virus inactivated vaccines made by Sanofi Pasteur in Europe. Vaxigrip provides immune responses to three influenza strains and VaxigripTetra adds another B strain. VaxigripTetra was approved in Europe in 2016 except for infants younger than three years old.

=== Flublok/Flublok Quadrivalent ===
Flublok and its quadrivalent formulation are recombinant subunit vaccines prepared in cell cultures. Recombinant influenza vaccines are produced using recombinant virus technology. This method does not require an egg-grown vaccine virus and does not use chicken eggs in the production process. The DNA for the hemagglutinin antigen of influenza virus is added to a baculovirus. This recombinant virus is then used to infect cultured insect cells (of the moth Spodoptera frugiperda), which subsequently produce the hemagglutinin protein. The protein is harvested and purified. This is done for four different types of influenza hemagglutinin to create the Flublok Quadrivalent vaccine.

=== Supemtek/Supemtek Tetra ===
Supemtek is a trivalent vaccine.

Supemtek Tetra is a quadrivalent vaccine.

== Seqirus ==
Afluria and its quadrivalent formulation are a split virus inactivated vaccines. Fluad and its quadrivalent formulations are adjuvanted surface antigen inactivated vaccines. Flucelvax and its quadrivalent formulations are surface antigen inactivated vaccines prepared in cell cultures.

Novartis developed the first influenza vaccine, which did not need to be grown in chicken eggs, a cell-based vaccine. In 2014, CSL Limited obtained Novartis' flu vaccine unit, and transferred it to CSL Subsidiary, bioCSL, named Seqirus.

The following are list of bioCSL flu vaccine brands:

- Trivalent
  - Afluria, also marketed as Enzira, Fluvax, and Nilgrip in various different markets
  - Agrippal, also marketed as Begripal, Fluazur, Sandovac, Agriflu, and Chiroflu in various different markets
  - Fluad,
  - Fluad Pediatric, a pediatric vaccine
  - Flucelvax
- Quadrivalent
  - Afluria Quadrivalent, also marketed as Afluria Quad and Afluria Tetra in various different markets
  - Fluad Quad
  - Fluad Quadrivalent
  - Fluad Tetra
  - Flucelvax Quad
  - Flucelvax Quadrivalent
  - Flucelvax Tetra

== See also ==
- H5N1 vaccine
- Historical annual reformulations of the influenza vaccine
- Pandemrix, a historic H1N1 pandemic flu vaccine
