= H5N1 vaccine =

Vaccine designed to provide immunity against H5N1 influenza

Vaccine description
- Target: H5N1
- Vaccine type: Inactivated

Clinical data
- Trade names: Audenz, others
- AHFS/Drugs.com: Micromedex Detailed Consumer Information
- License data: US DailyMed: H5N1
- ATC code: J07BB (WHO)

Legal status
- Legal status: CA: ℞-only; US: ℞-only; EU: Rx-only

A H5N1 vaccine is an influenza vaccine intended to provide immunization to influenza A virus subtype H5N1.

Vaccination of poultry against the avian H5N1 influenza epizootic is widespread in certain countries. Some vaccines also exist for use in humans. As of July 2024, these include Aflunov, Audenz, Celldemic, and Incellipan.

The hemagglutinin protein is the main viral antigen of influenza A viruses, including the H5N1 subtype. Vaccination can induce antibodies that block the functions of the H5 hemagglutinin and neutralize virus infectivity.

The influenza virus is highly variable - the H5N1 virus infecting cattle in the USA (Note: As of December 2024) is different from the viruses that showed up in poultry in 1997. However licensed vaccines can be updated in a process similar to that used for updating seasonal influenza vaccines.

== Timeline ==
February 2025, the Public Health Agency of Canada announced it had secured 500,000 initial doses of GSK's Arepanrix H5N1 human vaccine to protect people most at risk. This includes farmers, healthcare providers, and veterinarians. This vaccine incorporates antigenic material from the A/American wigeon/South Carolina/22-000345-001/2021 (H5N1)-like strain.

In December 2024 the UK government announced the purchase of five million doses of human H5 influenza vaccine to boost the country’s resilience in the event of a possible H5 influenza pandemic. The vaccine will be manufactured by CSL Seqirus UK Limited. The vaccine is based on the A/H5N8/Astrakhan/3212/2020 clade 2.3.4.4b strain of influenza. If needed, the H5 vaccine could be used while a pandemic-specific vaccine is developed and produced.

In July 2024, CSL Seqirus, Sanofi and GSK have collectively secured $72 million in funding from the U.S. health department to boost the country’s supply of bird flu vaccines.

In June 2024, the European Commission's Health Emergency Preparedness and Response Authority (HERA) signed a four-year contract with CSL Seqirus to secure 665,000 pre-pandemic vaccines with a provision for a further 40 million doses of avian flu vaccines. The member states participating in the contract are 15 of the 36 countries that have signed the EU's Joint Procurement Agreement for Medical Countermeasures, which includes all EU and EEA Member States. These fifteen countries are: Denmark, Latvia, France, Cyprus, Lithuania, Malta, the Netherlands, Austria, Portugal, Slovenia, Finland, Greece, Ireland, Iceland, and Norway.

In May 2024, CSL Seqirus was selected by the US government to supply 4.8 million doses of an H5 vaccine to the National Pre-Pandemic Influenza Vaccine Stockpile program. The vaccine is well matched to the H5N1 strains currently circulating in wild birds and cattle.

In January 2020, the US approved Audenz, an adjuvanted influenza A (H5N1) monovalent vaccine. Audenz is indicated for active immunization for the prevention of influenza A/turkey/Turkey/1/2005 NIBRG-23. In the event of an outbreak of the disease in humans, the strain could be updated in a process similar to that used for updating seasonal vaccines.

In November 2013, the US approved an experimental H5N1 bird flu vaccine to be held in stockpiles. In a trial including 3,400 adults, 91% of people age 18–64 and 74% of people age 65 or older formed an immune response sufficient to provide protection. Reported adverse effects were generally mild, with pain at the injection site being the most common adverse effect.

== List of licensed and candidate vaccines ==
A "candidate" vaccine is one which has been developed to be safe and effective, but has not received marketing authorization. As of January 2025, the following vaccines are available or under development:

- Adjupanrix: approved for medical use in the European Union in October 2009. Adjupanrix contains the flu strain A/VietNam/1194/2004 NIBRG 14 (H5N1).
- Aflunov: A vaccine for people aged six months of age and older, approved for medical use in the European Union in November 2010. Aflunov contains the flu strain A/turkey/Turkey/1/2005 (H5N1)-like strain (NIBRG-23) (clade 2.2.1).
- Audenz: A vaccine for adults that contains the killed A/Astrakhan/3212/2020 (H5N8)-like strain.
- Foclivia: approved for medical use in the European Union in October 2009. A vaccine that contains the A/Vietnam/1194/2004 (H5N1) flu strain.
- Pumarix: A vaccine approved for medical use in the European Union in March 2011.

In February 2025, the Committee for Veterinary Medicinal Products of the European Medicines Agency adopted a positive opinion, recommending the granting of a marketing authorization for the veterinary medicinal product Vectormune HVT-AIV, concentrate and solvent for suspension for injection, intended for one day-old chickens. The applicant for this veterinary medicinal product is CEVA Sante Animale. Vectormune HVT-AIV is a cell-associated, live recombinant vector vaccine containing one active substance: the recombinant live turkey herpes virus (HVT, Marek’s disease serotype 3) genetically modified to express the hemagglutinin 5 (H5) encoding the gene of highly pathogenic avian influenza virus (HPAIV) H5N1.

Some older H5N1 vaccines for humans that have been licensed are:

- Sanofi Pasteur's vaccine approved by the United States in April 2007.
- GlaxoSmithKline's vaccine Prepandrix approved by the European Union in May 2008.
- CSL Limited's vaccine Panvax approved by Australia in June 2008.

== Vaccine production ==
H5N1 continually mutates, meaning vaccines based on current samples of avian H5N1 cannot be depended upon to work in the case of a future pandemic of H5N1. While there can be some cross-protection against related flu strains, the best protection would be from a vaccine specifically produced for any future pandemic flu virus strain. Daniel R. Lucey, co-director of the Biohazardous Threats and Emerging Diseases graduate program at Georgetown University, has made this point, "There is no H5N1 pandemic so there can be no pandemic vaccine." However, "pre-pandemic vaccines" have been created; are being refined and tested; and do have some promise both in furthering research and preparedness for the next pandemic. Vaccine manufacturing companies are being funded to increase flexible capacity so that if a pandemic vaccine is needed, facilities will be available for rapid production of large amounts of a vaccine specific to a new pandemic strain.
