= Influenza A virus subtype H2N2 =

Virus classification
- (unranked): Virus
- Realm: Riboviria
- Kingdom: Orthornavirae
- Phylum: Negarnaviricota
- Class: Insthoviricetes
- Order: Articulavirales
- Family: Orthomyxoviridae
- Genus: Alphainfluenzavirus
- Species: Influenza A virus
- Serotype: Influenza A virus subtype H2N2

Subtype of Influenza A virus

Influenza A virus subtype H2N2 (A/H2N2) is a subtype of Influenza A virus. H2N2 has mutated into various strains including the "Asian flu" strain (now extinct in the wild), H3N2, and various strains found in birds. It is also suspected of causing a human pandemic in 1889.

== Russian flu ==
Some believe that the 1889–1890 Russian flu was caused by the influenzavirus A virus subtype H2N2, but the evidence is not conclusive. It is the earliest flu pandemic for which detailed records are available. More recently, there are speculations that it might have been caused by one of the coronaviruses first discovered in the 1960s.

== Asian flu pandemic ==
The "Asian Flu" was a category 2 flu pandemic outbreak of influenzavirus A that first appeared in Guizhou, China in early 1957 and lasted until 1958. The first cases were reported in Singapore in February 1957. In February 1957, a new influenza A (H2N2) virus emerged in East Asia, triggering a pandemic ("Asian Flu"). This H2N2 virus was composed of three different genes from an H2N2 virus that originated from an avian influenza A virus, including the H2 hemagglutinin and the N2 neuraminidase genes. It was first reported in Singapore in February 1957, Hong Kong in April 1957, and in coastal cities in the United States in summer 1957. Some authors believe it originated from mutation in wild ducks combining with a pre-existing human strain. Other authors are less certain. It reached Hong Kong by April, and US by June. Estimates of US and worldwide deaths caused by this pandemic varies widely depending on source; ranging from approximately 69,800 to 116,000 in the United States, and worldwide from 1 million to 4 million, with the World Health Organization (WHO) settling on "about 2 million," with an overall mortality rate of 0.6%.

The Asian Flu strain later evolved via antigenic shift into H3N2 which caused a milder pandemic from 1968 to 1969.

== Current situation ==
As of March 2026, avian influenza subtype H2N2 (LPAIVs) continues to circulate in birds. This subtype previously caused the 1957 human influenza pandemic resulting in an estimated 2 million deaths worldwide. After the emergence of H3N2 in 1968, H2N2 viruses disappeared from the human population. As a result, individuals born after this period are thought to have little to no immunity.

The pandemic strain, [A(H2N2)pdm1957], was adapted to humans and displayed dual-receptor binding ability recognizing avian-type receptors (α-2,3 sialic acid receptor) and human-type receptors (α-2,6 sialic acid receptor). These properties are caused by few point mutations in surface glycoproteins Hemagglutinin (HA), which influence immune escape, cross species transmission, and Neuraminidase (NA), which facilitates viral release by cleaving sialic acid residues. Over time, influenza viruses accumulate mutations through antigenic drift, causing distant antigenic characteristics between the Avian H2N2 influenza virus and Human H2N2 influenza virus (1957).

A study by Sun et al., 2024, observed that a few amino acid substitutions in HA, the polymerase protein PB2 and non-structural protein NS1 of the current circulating strain avian H2N2 virus altered receptor binding properties associated with mammalian adaptation. These mutations are associated with reduced recognition by the existing antibodies in humans and a shift in receptor binding preference from avian-type receptor (α-2,3 sialic acid receptor) to predominantly binding human-type receptor (α-2,6 sialic acid receptor). Furthermore, experimental serial passaging of the virus in mice resulted in increased virulence, suggesting that this virus is capable of adapting to mammals. In animal models including guinea pigs and ferrets, which closely mimic human influenza infection, the adapted virus demonstrated its ability to transmit through direct contact and respiratory droplets.

Although the virus is currently avian and are considered low pathogenic, previous pandemics and experimental studies indicate that the Avian H2N2 subtype possesses the potential to adapt to mammals and therefore are an interest for continued surveillance and pandemic preparedness.
