= Historical annual reformulations of the influenza vaccine =

Since 1999, the World Health Organization (WHO) has issued annual recommendations for influenza vaccine formulations. One reformulation of the influenza vaccine is for the Northern Hemisphere, and the other is for the Southern Hemisphere. Both recommendations are trivalent, i.e. featuring three strains.

Since the 2012–2013 season, the WHO recommendations have also included the formulation of an annual quadrivalent vaccine, featuring an additional strain of Influenza B virus, B/Yamagata.

Due to the widespread use of non-pharmaceutical interventions at the beginning of the COVID-19 pandemic, the B/Yamagata influenza lineage has not been isolated since March 2020, and may have been eradicated. Starting with the 2024 Southern Hemisphere influenza season, the WHO and other regulatory bodies have removed this strain from influenza vaccine recommendations.

== Northern Hemisphere recommended strains ==
The following is a list of strains for the Northern Hemisphere influenza season recommended by the World Health Organization. Starting in the 2012–2013 season, the recommendation shifted to include the composition of a quadrivalent influenza vaccine (QIV) that contains both influenza B lineages, alongside a trivalent influenza vaccine (TIV) containing one influenza B lineage.

NH winter season	Influenza A H1N1	Influenza A H3N2	Influenza B Victoria	Influenza B Yamagata
1998–1999	A/Beijing/262/95 (H1N1)-like virus	A/Sydney/5/97 (H3N2)-like virus	N/A	B/Beijing/184/93-like virus
1999–2000	A/Beijing/262/95 (H1N1)-like virus	A/Sydney/5/97 (H3N2)-like virus	B/Shangdong/7/97-like virus (Note: The recommendation was for either the B/Victoria or the B/Yamagata strain.)	B/Beijing/184/93-like virus
2000–2001	A/New Caledonia/20/99 (H1N1)-like virus	A/Moscow/10/99 (H3N2)-like virus	N/A	B/Beijing/184/93-like virus
2001–2002	A/New Caledonia/20/99 (H1N1)-like virus	A/Moscow/10/99 (H3N2)-like virus	N/A	B/Sichuan/379/99-like virus
2002–2003	A/New Caledonia/20/99 (H1N1)-like virus	A/Moscow/10/99 (H3N2)-like virus	B/Hong Kong/330/2001-like virus	N/A
2003–2004	A/New Caledonia/20/99 (H1N1)-like virus	A/Moscow/10/99 (H3N2)-like virus	B/Hong Kong/330/2001-like virus	N/A
2004–2005	A/New Caledonia/20/99 (H1N1)-like virus	A/Fujian/411/2002 (H3N2)-like virus	N/A	B/Shanghai/361/2002-like virus
2005–2006	A/New Caledonia/20/99 (H1N1)-like virus	A/California/7/2004 (H3N2)-like virus	N/A	B/Shanghai/361/2002-like virus
2006–2007	A/New Caledonia/20/99 (H1N1)-like virus	A/Wisconsin/67/2005 (H3N2)-like virus	B/Malaysia/2506/2004-like virus	N/A
2007–2008	A/Solomon Islands/3/2006 (H1N1)-like virus	A/Wisconsin/67/2005 (H3N2)-like virus	B/Malaysia/2506/2004-like virus	N/A
2008–2009	A/Brisbane/59/2007 (H1N1)-like virus	A/Brisbane/10/2007 (H3N2)-like virus	N/A	B/Florida/4/2006-like virus
2009–2010	A/Brisbane/59/2007 (H1N1)-like virus	A/Brisbane/10/2007 (H3N2)-like virus	B/Brisbane/60/2008-like virus	N/A
2010–2011	A/California/7/2009 (H1N1)-like virus	A/Perth/16/2009 (H3N2)-like virus	B/Brisbane/60/2008-like virus	N/A
2011–2012	A/California/7/2009 (H1N1)-like virus	A/Perth/16/2009 (H3N2)-like virus	B/Brisbane/60/2008-like virus	N/A
2012–2013	A/California/7/2009 (H1N1)pdm09 (Note: (H1N1)pdm09 is newer nomenclature for the 2009 pandemic H1N1 virus, not a different strain.)-like virus	A/Victoria/361/2011 (H3N2)-like virus	B/Brisbane/60/2008-like virus	B/Wisconsin/1/2010-like virus
2013–2014	A/California/7/2009 (H1N1)pdm09-like virus	A(H3N2) virus antigenically like the cell-propagated prototype virus A/Victoria/361/2011 (Note: It is recommended that A/Texas/50/2012 is used as the A(H3N2) vaccine component because of antigenic changes in earlier A/Victoria/361/2011-like vaccine viruses (such as IVR-165) resulting from adaptation to propagation in eggs.)	B/Brisbane/60/2008-like virus	B/Massachusetts/2/2012-like virus
2014–2015	A/California/7/2009 (H1N1)pdm09-like virus	A/Texas/50/2012 (H3N2)-like virus (Note: A/Texas/50/2012 is an A(H3N2) virus that following adaptation to growth in eggs has maintained antigenic properties similar to the majority of recently circulating cell-propagated A(H3N2) viruses including A/Victoria/361/2011.)	B/Brisbane/60/2008-like virus	B/Massachusetts/2/2012-like virus
2015–2016	A/California/7/2009 (H1N1)pdm09-like virus	A/Switzerland/9715293/2013 (H3N2)-like virus	B/Brisbane/60/2008-like virus	B/Phuket/3073/2013-like virus
2016–2017	A/California/7/2009 (H1N1)pdm09-like virus	A/Hong Kong/4801/2014 (H3N2)-like virus	B/Brisbane/60/2008-like virus	B/Phuket/3073/2013-like virus
2017–2018	A/Michigan/45/2015 (H1N1)pdm09-like virus	A/Hong Kong/4801/2014 (H3N2)-like virus	B/Brisbane/60/2008-like virus	B/Phuket/3073/2013-like virus
2018–2019	A/Michigan/45/2015 (H1N1)pdm09-like virus	A/Singapore/INFIMH-16-0019/2016 (H3N2)-like virus	B/Colorado/06/2017-like virus (B/Victoria/2/87 lineage)	B/Phuket/3073/2013-like virus (B/Yamagata/16/88 lineage)
2019–2020	A/Brisbane/02/2018 (H1N1)pdm09-like virus	A/Kansas/14/2017 (H3N2)-like virus	B/Colorado/06/2017-like virus (B/Victoria/2/87 lineage)	B/Phuket/3073/2013-like virus (B/Yamagata/16/88 lineage)
2020–2021 egg-based vaccines	A/Guangdong-Maonan/SWL1536/2019 (H1N1)pdm09-like virus	A/Hong Kong/2671/2019 (H3N2)-like virus	B/Washington/02/2019 (B/Victoria lineage)-like virus	B/Phuket/3073/2013 (B/Yamagata lineage)-like virus
2020–2021 cell- or recombinant-based vaccines	A/Hawaii/70/2019 (H1N1)pdm09-like virus	A/Hong Kong/45/2019 (H3N2)-like virus	B/Washington/02/2019 (B/Victoria lineage)-like virus	B/Phuket/3073/2013 (B/Yamagata lineage)-like virus
2021–2022 egg-based vaccines	A/Victoria/2570/2019 (H1N1)pdm09-like virus	A/Cambodia/e0826360/2020 (H3N2)-like virus	B/Washington/02/2019 (B/Victoria lineage)-like virus	B/Phuket/3073/2013 (B/Yamagata lineage)-like virus
2021–2022 cell- or recombinant-based vaccines	A/Wisconsin/588/2019 (H1N1)pdm09-like virus	A/Cambodia/e0826360/2020 (H3N2)-like virus	B/Washington/02/2019 (B/Victoria lineage)-like virus	B/Phuket/3073/2013 (B/Yamagata lineage)-like virus
2022–2023 egg-based vaccines	A/Victoria/2570/2019 (H1N1)pdm09-like virus	A/Darwin/9/2021 (H3N2)-like virus	B/Austria/1359417/2021 (B/Victoria lineage)-like virus	B/Phuket/3073/2013 (B/Yamagata lineage)-like virus
2022–2023 cell- or recombinant-based vaccines	A/Wisconsin/588/2019 (H1N1)pdm09-like virus	A/Darwin/6/2021 (H3N2)-like virus	B/Austria/1359417/2021 (B/Victoria lineage)-like virus	B/Phuket/3073/2013 (B/Yamagata lineage)-like virus
2023–2024 egg-based vaccines	A/Victoria/4897/2022 (H1N1)pdm09-like virus	A/Darwin/9/2021 (H3N2)-like virus	B/Austria/1359417/2021 (B/Victoria lineage)-like virus	B/Phuket/3073/2013 (B/Yamagata lineage)-like virus
2023–2024 cell- or recombinant-based vaccines	A/Wisconsin/67/2022 (H1N1)pdm09-like virus	A/Darwin/6/2021 (H3N2)-like virus	B/Austria/1359417/2021 (B/Victoria lineage)-like virus	B/Phuket/3073/2013 (B/Yamagata lineage)-like virus
2024–2025 egg-based vaccines	A/Victoria/4897/2022 (H1N1)pdm09-like virus	A/Thailand/8/2022 (H3N2)-like virus	B/Austria/1359417/2021 (B/Victoria lineage)-like virus	B/Phuket/3073/2013 (B/Yamagata lineage)-like virus (Note: The WHO, the FDA, and the EMA advise that the B/Yamagata lineage antigen should be excluded from influenza vaccines as it is no longer warranted.)
2024–2025 cell- or recombinant-based vaccines	A/Wisconsin/67/2022 (H1N1)pdm09-like virus	A/Massachusetts/18/2022 (H3N2)-like virus	B/Austria/1359417/2021 (B/Victoria lineage)-like virus	B/Phuket/3073/2013 (B/Yamagata lineage)-like virus
2025–2026 egg-based vaccines	A/Victoria/4897/2022 (H1N1)pdm09-like virus	A/Croatia/10136RV/2023 (H3N2)-like virus	B/Austria/1359417/2021 (B/Victoria lineage)-like virus	B/Phuket/3073/2013 (B/Yamagata lineage)-like virus
2025–2026 cell- or recombinant-based vaccines	A/Wisconsin/67/2022 (H1N1)pdm09-like virus	A/District of Columbia/27/2023 (H3N2)-like virus	B/Austria/1359417/2021 (B/Victoria lineage)-like virus	B/Phuket/3073/2013 (B/Yamagata lineage)-like virus
2026–2027 egg-based vaccines	A/Missouri/11/2025 (H1N1)pdm09-like virus	A/Darwin/1454/2025 (H3N2)-like virus	B/Tokyo/EIS13-175/2025 (B/Victoria lineage)-like virus	N/A
2026–2027 cell- or recombinant-based vaccines	A/Missouri/11/2025 (H1N1)pdm09-like virus	A/Darwin/1415/2025 (H3N2)-like virus	B/Pennsylvania/14/2025 (B/Victoria lineage)-like virus	N/A

== Southern Hemisphere recommended strains ==
The following is a list of strains for the Southern Hemisphere influenza season recommended by the World Health Organization.

SH winter season	Influenza A H1N1	Influenza A H3N2	Influenza B Victoria	Influenza B Yamagata
1999	A/Beijing/262/95 (H1N1)-like virus	A/Sydney/5/97 (H3N2)-like virus	N/A	B/Beijing/184/93-like virus
2000	A/New Caledonia/20/99 (H1N1)-like virus	A/Moscow/10/99 (H3N2)-like virus	B/Shangdong/7/97-like virus	B/Beijing/184/93-like virus
2001	A/New Caledonia/20/99 (H1N1)-like virus	A/Moscow/10/99 (H3N2)-like virus	N/A	B/Sichuan/379/99-like virus
2002	A/New Caledonia/20/99 (H1N1)-like virus	A/Moscow/10/99 (H3N2)-like virus	N/A	B/Sichuan/379/99-like virus
2003	A/New Caledonia/20/99 (H1N1)-like virus	A/Moscow/10/99 (H3N2)-like virus	B/Hong Kong/330/2001-like virus	N/A
2004	A/New Caledonia/20/99 (H1N1)-like virus	A/Fujian/411/2002 (H3N2)-like virus	B/Hong Kong/330/2001-like virus	N/A
2005	A/New Caledonia/20/99 (H1N1)-like virus	A/Wellington/1/2004 (H3N2)-like virus	N/A	B/Shanghai/361/2002-like virus
2006	A/New Caledonia/20/99 (H1N1)-like virus	A/California/7/2004 (H3N2)-like virus	B/Malaysia/2506/2004-like virus	N/A
2007	A/New Caledonia/20/99 (H1N1)-like virus	A/Wisconsin/67/2005 (H3N2)-like virus	B/Malaysia/2506/2004-like virus	N/A
2008	A/Solomon Islands/3/2006 (H1N1)-like virus	A/Brisbane/10/2007 (H3N2)-like virus	N/A	B/Florida/4/2006-like virus
2009	A/Brisbane/59/2007 (H1N1)-like virus	A/Brisbane/10/2007 (H3N2)-like virus	N/A	B/Florida/4/2006-like virus
2010	A/California/7/2009 (H1N1)-like virus	A/Perth/16/2009 (H3N2)-like virus	B/Brisbane/60/2008-like virus	N/A
2011	A/California/7/2009 (H1N1)-like virus	A/Perth/16/2009 (H3N2)-like virus	B/Brisbane/60/2008-like virus	N/A
2012	A/California/7/2009 (H1N1)pdm09-like virus	A/Perth/16/2009 (H3N2)-like virus	B/Brisbane/60/2008-like virus	N/A
2013	A/California/7/2009 (H1N1)pdm09-like virus	A/Victoria/361/2011 (H3N2)-like virus	B/Brisbane/60/2008-like virus	B/Wisconsin/1/2010-like virus
2014	A/California/7/2009 (H1N1)pdm09-like virus	A/Texas/50/2012 (H3N2)-like virus	B/Brisbane/60/2008-like virus	B/Massachusetts/2/2012-like virus
2015	A/California/7/2009 (H1N1)pdm09-like virus	A/Switzerland/9715293/2013 (H3N2)-like virus	B/Brisbane/60/2008-like virus	B/Phuket/3073/2013-like virus
2016	A/California/7/2009 (H1N1)pdm09-like virus	A/Hong Kong/4801/2014 (H3N2)-like virus	B/Brisbane/60/2008-like virus	B/Phuket/3073/2013-like virus
2017	A/Michigan/45/2015 (H1N1)pdm09-like virus	A/Hong Kong/4801/2014 (H3N2)-like virus	B/Brisbane/60/2008-like virus	B/Phuket/3073/2013-like virus
2018	A/Michigan/45/2015 (H1N1)pdm09-like virus	A/Singapore/INFIMH-16-0019/2016 (H3N2)-like virus	B/Brisbane/60/2008-like virus	B/Phuket/3073/2013-like virus
2019	A/Michigan/45/2015 (H1N1)pdm09-like virus	A/Switzerland/8060/2017 (H3N2)-like virus	B/Colorado/06/2017-like virus (B/Victoria/2/87 lineage)	B/Phuket/3073/2013-like virus (B/Yamagata/16/88 lineage)
2020	A/Brisbane/02/2018 (H1N1)pdm09-like virus	A/South Australia/34/2019 (H3N2)-like virus	B/Washington/02/2019-like (B/Victoria lineage) virus	B/Phuket/3073/2013-like (B/Yamagata lineage) virus
2021 egg-based vaccines	A/Victoria/2570/2019 (H1N1)pdm09-like virus	A/Hong Kong/2671/2019 (H3N2)-like virus	B/Washington/02/2019 (B/Victoria lineage)-like virus	B/Phuket/3073/2013 (B/Yamagata lineage)-like virus
2021 cell- or recombinant-based vaccines	A/Wisconsin/588/2019 (H1N1)pdm09-like virus	A/Hong Kong/45/2019 (H3N2)-like virus	B/Washington/02/2019 (B/Victoria lineage)-like virus	B/Phuket/3073/2013 (B/Yamagata lineage)-like virus
2022 egg-based vaccines	A/Victoria/2570/2019 (H1N1)pdm09-like virus	A/Darwin/9/2021 (H3N2)-like virus	B/Austria/1359417/2021 (B/Victoria lineage)-like virus	B/Phuket/3073/2013 (B/Yamagata lineage)-like virus
2022 cell- or recombinant-based vaccines	A/Wisconsin/588/2019 (H1N1)pdm09-like virus	A/Darwin/6/2021 (H3N2)-like virus	B/Austria/1359417/2021 (B/Victoria lineage)-like virus	B/Phuket/3073/2013 (B/Yamagata lineage)-like virus
2023 egg-based vaccines	A/Sydney/5/2021 (H1N1)pdm09-like virus	A/Darwin/9/2021 (H3N2)-like virus	B/Austria/1359417/2021 (B/Victoria lineage)-like virus	B/Phuket/3073/2013 (B/Yamagata lineage)-like virus
2023 cell- or recombinant-based vaccines	A/Sydney/5/2021 (H1N1)pdm09-like virus	A/Darwin/6/2021 (H3N2)-like virus	B/Austria/1359417/2021 (B/Victoria lineage)-like virus	B/Phuket/3073/2013 (B/Yamagata lineage)-like virus
2024 egg-based vaccines	A/Victoria/4897/2022 (H1N1)pdm09-like virus	A/Thailand/8/2022 (H3N2)-like virus	B/Austria/1359417/2021 (B/Victoria lineage)-like virus	B/Phuket/3073/2013 (B/Yamagata lineage)-like virus
2024 cell- or recombinant-based vaccines	A/Wisconsin/67/2022 (H1N1)pdm09-like virus	A/Massachusetts/18/2022 (H3N2)-like virus	B/Austria/1359417/2021 (B/Victoria lineage)-like virus	B/Phuket/3073/2013 (B/Yamagata lineage)-like virus
2025 egg-based vaccines	A/Victoria/4897/2022 (H1N1)pdm09-like virus	A/Croatia/10136RV/2023 (H3N2)-like virus	B/Austria/1359417/2021 (B/Victoria lineage)-like virus	B/Phuket/3073/2013 (B/Yamagata lineage)-like virus
2025 cell- or recombinant-based vaccines	A/Wisconsin/67/2022 (H1N1)pdm09-like virus	A/District of Columbia/27/2023 (H3N2)-like virus	B/Austria/1359417/2021 (B/Victoria lineage)-like virus	B/Phuket/3073/2013 (B/Yamagata lineage)-like virus
2026 egg-based vaccines	A/Missouri/11/2025 (H1N1)pdm09-like virus	A/Singapore/GP20238/2024 (H3N2)-like virus	B/Austria/1359417/2021 (B/Victoria lineage)-like virus	B/Yamagata lineage virus (B/Phuket/3073/2013-like virus
2026 cell- or recombinant-based vaccines	A/Missouri/11/2025 (H1N1)pdm09-like virus	A/Sydney/1359/2024 (H3N2)-like virus	B/Austria/1359417/2021 (B/Victoria lineage)-like virus	B/Yamagata lineage virus (B/Phuket/3073/2013-like virus
2027 egg-based vaccines	A/Missouri/11/2025 (H1N1)pdm09-like virus	A/Darwin/1454/2025 (H3N2)-like virus	B/Tokyo/EIS13-175/2025 (B/Victoria lineage)-like virus	N/A
2027 cell- or recombinant-based vaccines	A/Missouri/11/2025 (H1N1)pdm09-like virus	A/Darwin/1415/2025 (H3N2)-like virus	B/Pennsylvania/14/2025 (B/Victoria lineage)-like virus	N/A

== See also ==
- 2009 flu pandemic vaccine
