= Influenza A virus subtype H3N2 =

Virus classification
- (unranked): Virus
- Realm: Riboviria
- Kingdom: Orthornavirae
- Phylum: Negarnaviricota
- Class: Insthoviricetes
- Order: Articulavirales
- Family: Orthomyxoviridae
- Genus: Alphainfluenzavirus
- Species: Influenza virus
- Serotype: Influenza A virus subtype H3N2

Notable strains
- A/Fujian/411/2002(H3N2)

Virus subtype

Influenza A virus subtype H3N2 (A/H3N2) is a subtype of influenza A virus (IAV). Some human-adapted strains of A/H3N2 are endemic in humans and are one cause of seasonal influenza (flu). Other strains of A/H3N2 are endemic in pigs (swine influenza) and in birds (avian influenza). Subtypes of IAV are defined by the combination of the antigenic H and N proteins in the viral envelope; for example, "H1N1" designates an IAV subtype that has a type-1 hemagglutinin (H) protein and a type-1 neuraminidase (N) protein.

All subtypes of IAV share a negative-sense, segmented RNA genome. Under rare circumstances, one strain of the virus can acquire genetic material through genetic reassortment from a different strain and thus evolve to acquire new characteristics, enabling it to evade host immunity and occasionally to jump from one species of host to another. Major outbreaks of A/H3N2 strains in humans include Hong Kong Flu (1968–1969), and Fujian flu (2003–2004).

Each year, three influenza strains are chosen for inclusion in the forthcoming year's seasonal flu vaccination by the Global Influenza Surveillance and Response System of the World Health Organization (WHO). Since 1999, every annual formulation has included one strain of A/H3N2 as well as two other influenza strains - together representing strains thought most likely to cause significant human suffering in the coming season.

== Seasonal flu ==
Seasonal influenza is an annually recurring outbreak of flu, which occurs during the cold half of the year in each hemisphere. Annually, about 3 to 5 million cases of severe illness and 290,000 to 650,000 deaths from seasonal flu occur worldwide. A/H3N2 is one of the prevalent subtypes of flu which contribute to seasonal flu outbreaks, and a strain of A/H3N2 is usually included in the biannual reformulation of the flu vaccine.

== Swine flu ==
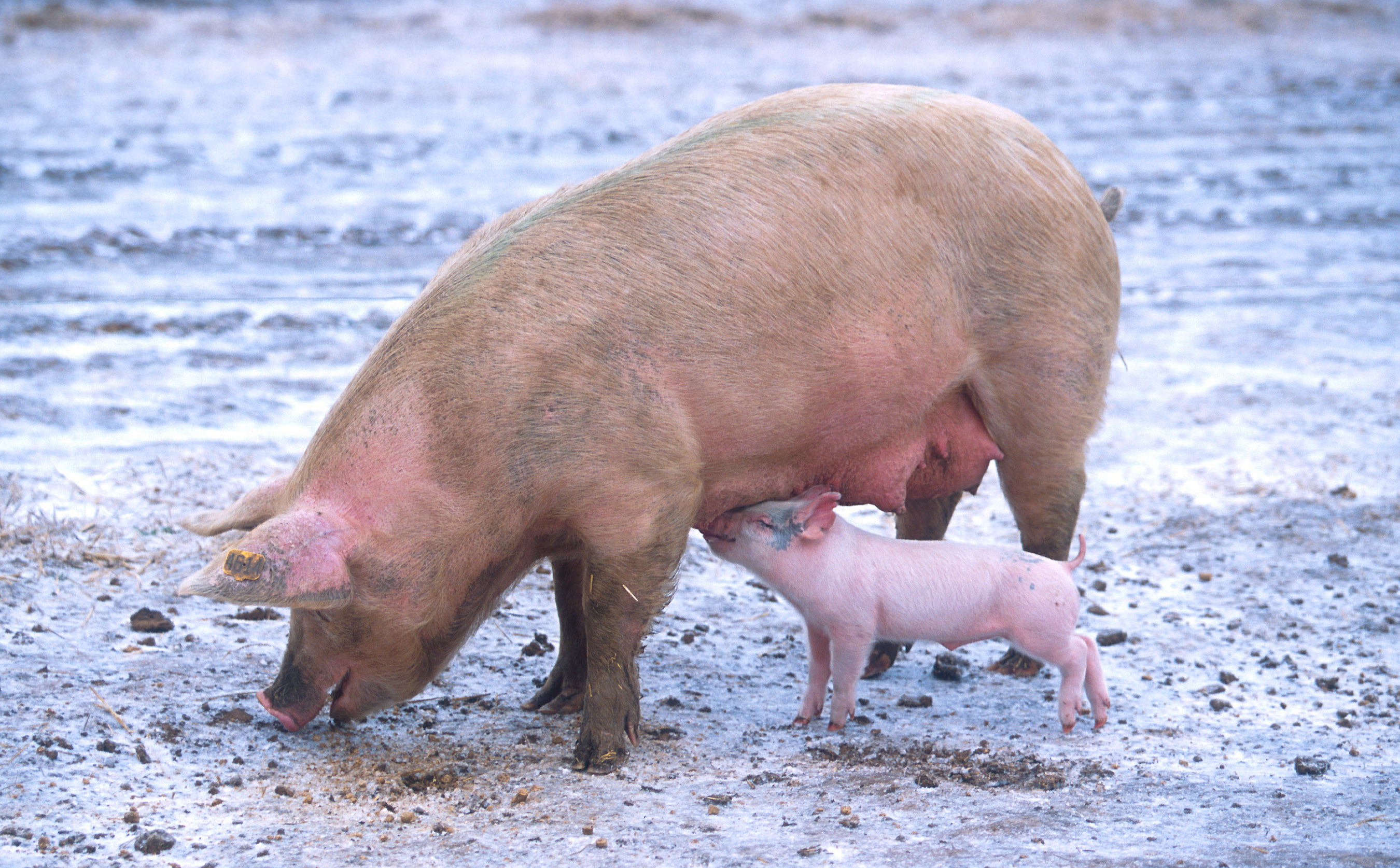
Pigs can harbor influenza viruses adapted to humans and others that are adapted to birds, allowing the viruses to exchange genes and create a pandemic strain.

A 2007 study reported: "In swine, three influenza A virus subtypes (H1N1, H3N2, and H1N2) are circulating throughout the world. In the United States, the classic H1N1 subtype was exclusively prevalent among swine populations before 1998; however, since late August 1998, H3N2 subtypes have been isolated from pigs. Most H3N2 virus isolates are triple reassortants, containing genes from human (HA, NA, and PB1), swine (NS, NP, and M), and avian (PB2 and PA) lineages. Present vaccination strategies for swine influenza virus (SIV) control and prevention in swine farms typically include the use of one of several bivalent SIV vaccines commercially available in the United States. Of the 97 recent H3N2 isolates examined, only 41 had strong serologic cross-reactions with antiserum to three commercial SIV vaccines. Since the protective ability of influenza vaccines depends primarily on the closeness of the match between the vaccine virus and the epidemic virus, the presence of nonreactive H3N2 SIV variants suggests current commercial vaccines might not effectively protect pigs from infection with a majority of H3N2 viruses."

Avian influenza virus H3N2 is endemic in pigs in China, and has been detected in pigs in Vietnam, contributing to the emergence of new variant strains. Pigs can carry human influenza viruses, which can combine (i.e. exchange homologous genome subunits by genetic reassortment) with H5N1, passing genes and mutating into a form which can pass easily among humans. H3N2 evolved from H2N2 by antigenic shift and caused the Hong Kong Flu pandemic of 1968 and 1969 that killed up to 750,000 humans. The dominant strain of annual flu in humans in January 2006 was H3N2. Measured resistance to the standard antiviral drugs amantadine and rimantadine in H3N2 in humans had increased to 91% by 2005. In August 2004, researchers in China found H5N1 in pigs.

== Significant outbreaks ==
=== Hong Kong Flu (1968–1969) ===
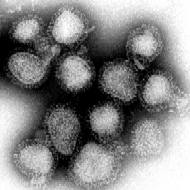
The influenza viruses that caused Hong Kong flu (magnified about 100,000 times)

The Hong Kong Flu was a flu pandemic caused by a strain of H3N2 descended from H2N2 by antigenic shift, in which genes from multiple subtypes reassorted to form a new virus. This pandemic of 1968 and 1969 killed an estimated one million people worldwide. The pandemic infected an estimated 500,000 Hong Kong residents, 15% of the population, with a low death rate. In the United States, about 100,000 people died.

Both the H2N2 and H3N2 pandemic flu strains contained genes from avian influenza viruses. The new subtypes arose in pigs coinfected with avian and human viruses and were soon transferred to humans. Swine were considered the original "intermediate host" for influenza, because they supported reassortment of divergent subtypes. However, other hosts appear capable of similar coinfection (e.g., many poultry species), and direct transmission of avian viruses to humans is possible. H1N1 may have been transmitted directly from birds to humans (Belshe 2005).

The Hong Kong flu strain shared internal genes and the neuraminidase with the 1957 Asian flu (H2N2). Accumulated antibodies to the neuraminidase or internal proteins may have resulted in much fewer casualties than most pandemics. However, cross-immunity within and between subtypes of influenza is poorly understood.

The Hong Kong flu was the first known outbreak of the H3N2 strain, though there is serologic evidence of H3N2 infections in the late 19th century. The first record of the outbreak in Hong Kong appeared on 13 July 1968 in an area with a density of about 500 people per acre in an urban setting. The outbreak reached maximum intensity in two weeks, lasting six weeks in total. The virus was isolated in Queen Mary Hospital. Flu symptoms lasted four to five days.

By July 1968, extensive outbreaks were reported in Vietnam and Singapore. By September 1968, it reached India, the Philippines, northern Australia and Europe. That same month, the virus entered California from United States troops returning from the Vietnam War. It reached Japan, Africa and South America in 1969.

=== Fujian flu (2003–2004) ===
Diagram of influenza virus nomenclature

Fujian flu refers to flu caused by either a Fujian human flu strain of the H3N2 subtype or a Fujian bird flu strain of the H5N1 subtype of the Influenza A virus. These strains are named after Fujian province in China.

A/Fujian (H3N2) human flu (from A/Fujian/411/2002(H3N2)-like flu virus strains) caused an unusually severe 2003–2004 flu season. This was due to a reassortment event that caused a minor clade to provide a haemagglutinin gene that later became part of the dominant strain in the 2002–2003 flu season. A/Fujian (H3N2) was made part of the trivalent influenza vaccine for the 2004–2005 flu season.

=== 2017–2018 ===
The 2017–2018 flu season was particularly severe, and at the time, it was the worst flu season since the 2009–2010 flu season, at the start of the 2009 swine flu pandemic. According to the director of the Centers for Disease Control and Prevention's influenza branch in January 2018, it was the first flu season where "we've had the entire continental US" show the same "widespread" flu activity, excluding the District of Columbia and Hawaii. Twenty-six of those states were classified by the CDC as having "high" activity in January 2018. This flu season was dominated by the H3N2 subtype, which is known for being the most severe of the 4 main seasonal flu subtypes. The Atlantic noted that the 2017 vaccine for the flu was only ten percent effective against H3N2 in Australia, indicating a severe mismatch for the vaccine component for the dominant flu strain that year. Similarly low effectiveness rates were reported against H3N2 across North America.

=== 2025–2026 ===
In June 2025, seven mutations were found in a new strain of H3N2 seasonal flu, belonging to the Subtype K. This variant emerged at the tail end of the 2025 flu season in the Southern Hemisphere, after the WHO had already selected the J.2 subclade to use for the H3N2 component, for the upcoming winter's flu vaccine. This led to an earlier than usual start to the flu season in the United Kingdom, Canada, and Japan, and unusually severe flu activity in those countries. This triggered fears that the new H3N2 Subtype K virus could cause the worst flu season in at least a decade, which would produce two severe back-to-back flu seasons. The new H3N2 Subtype K variant had an estimated basic reproduction number ($R_0$) around 1.4, slightly higher than the typical R0 of 1.2 for seasonal flu strains.

== See also ==
- 2009 swine flu pandemic
- Bird flu
- Influenza A virus subtype H7N9
- Canine influenza (Dog flu)
- Equine influenza (Horse flu)
- Swine influenza
