= Global Influenza Programme =

The Global Influenza Programme (GIP) is a program launched in 1947 by the World Health Organization with the purpose to provide member states with guidance, support and coordination of activities in order to make their health systems better prepared against seasonal, zoonotic and pandemic influenza threats to populations and individuals. GIP was initiated as one of WHO's initial programs.

== History ==
In 1947, an immediate concern in Europe was a major influenza outbreak in the continent, as well as the need to identify appropriate viruses for a vaccine against the circulating strains. The WHO Interim Committee of the United Nations agreed to begin a Global Influenza Programme (GIP) for the study and control of influenza. In 1948, the Interim Committee recommended the establishment of the first World Influenza Centre at the National Institute for Medical Research in London along with Regional Centres and Observers. A total of 38 regional centers (later named National Influenza Centers) were summoned to participate in the effort, which took extensive activity to develop plans and coordinate information and virus sharing. Five years after the establishment of GIP, the Global Influenza Surveillance Network (GISN) was established out of need for an influenza surveillance system to inform the methods for disease prevention and control. GISN would be later renamed Global Influenza Surveillance and Response System (GISRS).

== See also ==
- Global Influenza Surveillance and Response System
