= Global Influenza Surveillance and Response System =

The Global Influenza Surveillance and Response System (GISRS) is a global network of laboratories that has the purpose to monitor the spread of influenza with the aim to provide the World Health Organization with influenza control information. It was established in 1952 to conduct global influenza surveillance and to inform vaccine development. GISRS is coordinated by WHO and endorsed by national governments. Several millions of respiratory specimens are tested by GISRS annually to monitor the spread and evolution of influenza viruses through a network of laboratories in 127 countries representing 91% of the world's population. As well as human viruses, GISRS monitors avian and other potentially zoonotic influenza viruses. GISRS operates FluNet, an online tool used for virological surveillance of influenza.

In addition to the influenza pandemics of 1957, 1968 and 2009, GISRS has coordinated the world’s response to episodic human cases of infection with the avian influenza A(H5N1) virus since 1997, the first outbreaks of severe acute respiratory syndrome (SARS) in 2002, and the Middle East respiratory syndrome (MERS) in 2012 in some countries.

== History ==
In 1947, the WHO Interim Committee of the United Nations agreed to begin a Global Influenza Programme (GIP) for the study and control of influenza. A major outbreak of influenza in Europe was an immediate concern, as well as the identification of appropriate viruses for a vaccine against the virus strains which might be circulating. The establishment of regional influenza centers began in 1948. Five years after the creation of GIP, the Global Influenza Surveillance Network (GISN) was established in response to a need for an influenza surveillance system to inform the methods for disease prevention and control. GISN would later be renamed Global Influenza Surveillance and Response System (GISRS), evolving as an integrated scientific and technical global collaboration to fulfil the objectives and activities of GIP. GISRS gained momentum between the 1957 and 1968 pandemics. The growing network of national influenza centers focused on understanding disease activity and characteristics of influenza viruses globally. Through these efforts, the realization that the viruses were not only present in tropical countries but might circulate for much of the year was confirmed.

== Composition ==
As of 2015, GISRS comprised 142 national influenza centers in 115 countries, 6 WHO collaborating centers, 4 WHO essential regulatory laboratories, and 13 WHO H5 reference laboratories.

== Efficacy ==
GISRS is considered an "effective early warning system" for changes in influenza viruses circulating in the global population, which helps mitigate the consequences of a pandemic and maintain the efficacy of seasonal influenza vaccines.

== See also ==
- Global Influenza Programme
- Pandemic Influenza Preparedness Framework
