= Influenza A virus subtype H10N8 =

Virus classification
- (unranked): Virus
- Realm: Riboviria
- Kingdom: Orthornavirae
- Phylum: Negarnaviricota
- Class: Insthoviricetes
- Order: Articulavirales
- Family: Orthomyxoviridae
- Genus: Alphainfluenzavirus
- Species: Influenza A virus
- Serotype: Influenza A virus subtype H10N8

Type of avian flu

The influenza A virus subtype H10N8 is an avian influenza virus. It is one of three H10 subtype avian influenza viruses isolated from domestic ducks in China, designated as SH602/H10N8, FJ1761/H10N3 and SX3180/H10N7.

== Presence in non-human species ==
The first A/H10N8 virus was isolated from a duck in Guangdong province, China, in 2012. The virus shows high pathogenicity in mice. It was also found in waterfowls, feral dogs, and live poultry markets. While multiple H10 genotype viruses (e.g. H10N8, H10N3, and H10N7) are circulating in live poultry markets in China, their potential to infect mammals remains largely unknown.

== Presence in humans ==
Genome sequencing and virus characterization suggest that the virus strains that infected humans originated from poultry markets. H10N8, as well as H10N7, and H6N8, have been detected in people to a lesser extent than other strains.
