= Wuhan asiatic toad influenza virus =

Virus classification
- (unranked): Virus
- Realm: Riboviria
- Kingdom: Orthornavirae
- Phylum: Negarnaviricota
- Class: Insthoviricetes
- Order: Articulavirales
- Family: Orthomyxoviridae
- Virus: Wuhan asiatic toad influenza virus

Virus infecting toads

Wuhan asiatic toad influenza virus (WATV) is an RNA virus that infects Asiatic toads (Bufo gargarizans). It is most closely related to influenza B viruses, with a sequence similarity of 29 to 46%. It was first described in a 2018 study that used a large-scale meta-transcriptomic approach to identify non-mammalian and non-avian RNA viruses. WATV is classified under the phylum Negarnaviricota because it is a negative-sense RNA virus, which means it has an RNA genome that is complementary to the mRNA that encodes viral proteins. It is a member of the Orthomyxoviridae family, the Articulavirales order, and the Insthoviricetes class.

== Description ==
WATV has a segmented genome with six segments that encode the proteins PB1, PB2, PA, N, HA, and NA. NA is a protein that facilitates the spread of progeny viral particles. Despite low levels of sequence similarity, the structure of WATV NA is very similar to that of influenza B NA, often described as a mushroom-shaped tetramer. Two amino acid residues in the influenza B NA active site, 119 and 274, are usually glutamic acid, which has a negative charge, and histidine, which has a positive charge. In WATV NP, these residues are changed to proline and methionine, respectively, which are both uncharged amino acids. Therefore, the active site of the WATV NA is significantly different. These two amino acid residues have been shown to be associated with antiviral resistance. Indeed, current antivirals that target the NA protein such as zanamivir, oseltamivir carboxylate, and peramivir were significantly less effective against WATV compared to influenza B. Antiviral resistance is a major public health concern, as mutations in residues like 119 in influenza B NA could cause current antivirals to become ineffective. Antiviral resistance is more likely to arise if antivirals are not taken according to prescriptions.

Another protein, Hemagglutinin (HA), has also been studied in Wuhan asiatic toad influenza virus. HA binds to sialic acid receptors to allow the virus to enter a new host cell. WATV HA shows very little sequence homology with influenza B HA, though both proteins are homotrimers and have similar overall structures. A thermal melt experiment found that 50% of the WATV HA protein unfolds at around 31 °C. Since human chest temperatures are closer to 36-38 °C, HA would likely denature in a human host, and WATV would be unable to infect human cells. While Wuhan Asiatic Toad Virus may not be currently able to infect humans or birds, future mutations may change this. In general, these viruses are valuable to study through the lens of One Health, which emphasizes the link between human, environmental, and animal health.
