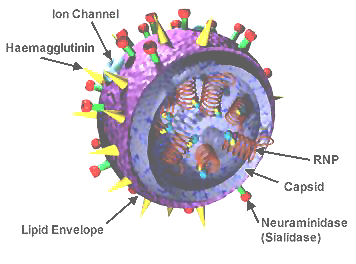

Virus classification
- (unranked): Virus
- Realm: Riboviria
- Kingdom: Orthornavirae
- Phylum: Negarnaviricota
- Class: Insthoviricetes
- Order: Articulavirales
- Family: Orthomyxoviridae
- Genus: Deltainfluenzavirus
- Species: Deltainfluenzavirus influenzae

Synonyms
- Influenza D virus

= Influenza D virus =

Deltainfluenzavirus influenzae

Species of virus

Influenza D virus is a species in the virus genus Deltainfluenzavirus, in the family Orthomyxoviridae, that causes influenza.

Influenza D viruses are known to infect pigs and cattle; no human infections from this virus have been observed. First isolated from pigs in 2011, the virus was categorized as a new genus of Orthomyxoviridae in 2016, distinct from the previously-known Influenzavirus C genus; before then, Influenza D virus was thought to be a subtype of Influenza C virus.

Cases of infections from the Type D virus are rare compared to Types A, B, and C. Similar to Type C, Type D has seven RNA segments and encodes nine proteins, while Types A and B have eight RNA segments and encode at least 10 proteins.

== Influenza D virus ==
The influenza viruses are members of the family Orthomyxoviridae. Influenza viruses A, B, C, and D represent the four antigenic types of influenza viruses. Of the four antigenic types, influenza A virus is the most severe, influenza B virus is less severe but can still cause outbreaks, and influenza C virus is usually only associated with minor symptoms. Influenza D virus is less common than the other antigenic types, and it is not known to cause any human infections. No samples of influenza D virus were detected in serum samples from humans; however, hemagglutination-inhibiting antibodies against influenza D virus have been detected in humans, with an estimated occurrence of 1.3% in the general population, suggesting that this virus may infect humans as well. However, those antibodies may have been produced after an infection by influenza C virus, the antibodies for which cross-react with the Type D virus. More studies are needed to conclude whether or not the Type D virus can infect humans.

Influenza D virus is 50% similar in amino acid composition to influenza C virus, similar to the level of divergence between types A and B, while types C and D have a much greater level of divergence from types A and B. Influenza viruses C and D were estimated to have diverged from a single ancestor over 1,500 years ago, around 482 AD. Influenza D virus itself currently has two lineages, which were estimated to have emerged over 45 years ago, around 1972 AD. Influenza viruses A and B are estimated to have diverged from a single ancestor around 4,000 years ago, while the ancestor of influenza viruses A and B and the ancestor of influenza viruses C and D are estimated to have diverged from a common ancestor around 8,000 years ago. Metatranscriptomics studies have also identified closely related "Influenza C and D-like" viruses in several amphibian and fish species.

Influenza A virus can infect a variety of animals as well as humans, and its natural host or reservoir is birds, whereas influenza viruses B, C, and D do not have animal reservoirs. Influenza viruses C and D are not as easily isolated so less information is known about these types, but studies show that they occur worldwide.

This virus may be spread through respiratory droplets or by fomites (non-living material) due to its ability to survive on surfaces for short durations. Influenza viruses have a relatively short incubation period (lapse of time from exposure to pathogen to the appearance of symptoms) of 18–72 hours and infect the epithelial cells of the respiratory tract.

In cell culture, influenza D virus has demonstrated an ability to replicate well at 37°C, the normal lung temperature, and can also replicate better and in more types of cells than the Type C virus. This study suggests that influenza D virus may be only a few genetic changes away from being able to invade the lower lung, even though the virus does not actively spread among humans and has a much slower mutation rate than the other influenza viruses.

== Structure and variation ==
Influenza viruses, like all viruses in the family Orthomyxoviridae, are enveloped RNA viruses with single stranded genomes. The antigens, matrix protein (M1) and nucleoprotein (NP), are used to determine if an influenza virus is type A, B, C, or D. The M1 protein is required for virus assembly and NP functions in transcription and replication. These viruses also contain proteins on the surface of the cell membrane called glycoproteins. Type A and B have two glycoproteins: hemagglutinin (HA) and neuraminidase (NA). Types C and D have only one glycoprotein: hemagglutinin-esterase fusion (HEF). These glycoproteins allow for attachment and fusion of viral and cellular membranes. Fusion of these membranes allows the viral proteins and genome to be released into the host cell, which then causes the infection. Types C and D are the only influenza viruses to express the enzyme esterase. This enzyme is similar to the enzyme neuraminidase produced by Types A and B in that they both function in destroying the host cell receptors. Glycoproteins may undergo mutations (antigenic drift) or reassortment in which a new HA or NA is produced (antigenic shift). Influenza viruses C and D are only capable of antigenic drift whereas Type A undergoes antigenic shift, as well. When either of these processes occur, the antibodies formed by the immune system no longer protect against these altered glycoproteins. Because of this, viruses continually cause infections.

== Identification ==
Influenza viruses C and D are different from Types A and B in their growth requirements. Because of this, Influenza D virus is not isolated and identified as frequently. Diagnosis is by virus isolation, serology, and other tests. Hemagglutination inhibition (HI) is one method of serology that detects antibodies for diagnostic purposes. Western blot (immunoblot assay) and enzyme-linked immunosorbent assay (ELISA) are two other methods used to detect proteins (or antigens) in serum. In each of these techniques, the antibodies for the protein of interest are added and the presence of the specific protein is indicated by a color change. ELISA was shown to have higher sensitivity to the HEF than the HI test. Because only Influenza viruses C and D produce esterase, In Situ Esterase Assays provide a quick and inexpensive method of detecting just Types C and D.

== Vaccination ==
Because influenza virus A has an animal reservoir that contains all the known subtypes and can undergo antigenic shift, this type of influenza virus is capable of producing pandemics. Influenza viruses A and B also cause seasonal epidemics every year due to their ability to antigenic shift. Influenza viruses C and D do not have this capability, and they have not been implicated in any pandemics; thus, there are currently no human vaccines available for Influenza viruses C or D. An inactivated Influenza D virus vaccine was developed for cattle; however, the vaccine only provided partial protection in challenge experiments.
