= London flu =

1972 influenza pandemic

During the 1972–1973 flu season in the Northern Hemisphere, a new variant of influenza, dubbed the 'London flu' by the press in the United States, was responsible for epidemics in many countries. 'London flu' was caused by a variant of influenza A/H3N2 that was first isolated in India in mid-1971 but only identified as a distinct strain in England in January, 1972.

Until May 1972, all known outbreaks of the London flu were limited to the Northern Hemisphere. In May, Australia, Malaysia, and Singapore reported their first outbreaks, indicating that the flu was spreading during the winter flu season in the Southern Hemisphere. In the United States outbreak, the London flu was reported in 49 of the 50 U.S. states, but it became widespread in only 21 of them. The first known American cases mostly affected American military personnel, with the outbreak beginning at the United States Air Force Academy in Colorado Springs, Colorado. The next known cases of the outbreak involved military installations in Arizona and Colorado. During the last week of November, the first major civilian outbreak developed in Baltimore. In early December, there were outbreaks in Memphis, Tennessee; Kansas City, Kansas, Anchorage; and Seattle, followed by significant outbreaks in New York City and the San Francisco Bay Area in late December.

In January 1973, the flu activity peaked in the Mid-Atlantic region and the Pacific Coast of the United States. The hardest-hit U.S. state was California, with mortality approaching the epidemic threshold in the 11 largest cities of Northern California. The epidemic reportedly aggravated an ongoing shortage of blood. In February 1973, the outbreak peaked in the Southeastern United States and the Midwestern United States. On 2 February, the CDC reported that the country had surpassed 1,000 deaths from influenza and pneumonia; by 9 February, the figure had risen to over 4,300 deaths since the beginning of the year. California alone reported at least 1,083 deaths in its major cities. The epidemic had begun to wane by the first week of March.

== History ==
=== Background ===
In July 1968, a novel subtype of influenza A, H3N2, caused a massive epidemic in Hong Kong and subsequently spread to other countries, leading to the global Hong Kong flu pandemic that lasted until 1970. Through April 1972, little antigenic difference from the original Hong Kong virus was noted on the whole among circulating strains. In July 1971, "a fairly extensive outbreak" occurred in Coonoor, India, though it did not immediately spread to other countries. Although the virus was originally isolated in India, it was not identified by the World Health Organization as a "drift" variant until January 1972, when a single strain, ultimately classified as A/England/42/72, was isolated among over 700 others collected during an epidemic in England. It was not until May 1972, however, as the winter flu season began in the Southern Hemisphere, that it resulted in outbreaks in Malaysia, Singapore, and Australia.

In the 1971–1972 flu season, influenza activity in the United States was reported in 49 of the 50 states and became widespread in 21. Pneumonia and influenza excess mortality remained above the epidemic threshold for seven consecutive weeks and ultimately was the highest since the initial introduction of the pandemic virus into the country in the 1968–1969 season. Despite the identification of the novel variant in January, the Center for Disease Control (today the Centers for Disease Control and Prevention) in June announced that the influenza A strain to be used in the vaccines for the 1972–1973 season would remain the same, albeit its potency increased. Although it was recognized that the variant could spread globally similar to the original virus, experts did not anticipate a serious epidemic after the widespread outbreak the year before. (The England variant was also not the only one to have emerged and caused outbreaks in the past year, and it was not until the middle of 1972 that it really took off.) In October, the CDC warned of the likely appearance of "new strains" of influenza A in the upcoming flu season.

London flu gets its name as the World Health Organization Influenza Centre's laboratories first identified it as a distinct strain in the UK in early 1972.

=== Progression within the United States ===
Similar to the introduction of the original pandemic virus into the country in 1968, the first cases of the new variant appeared among military personnel. On 21 October, just a couple of weeks after the CDC's warning, an outbreak began at the Air Force Academy in Colorado Springs, lasting into early November. A total of 870 were reported sick. During the first week of November, another outbreak developed at Lowry Air Force Base, east of Denver. Doctors reported seeing 35 new cases per day for at least 10 days. The Colorado Department of Health identified the variant as the cause of the outbreak, and this was for a time considered the first to occur in the continental US, though strains from the Academy outbreak were soon found to be highly related to those from the Base. In late November and early December, outbreaks were reported at two other military installations, one in Arizona and another near Colorado Springs.

The first major civilian outbreak developed in Baltimore the last week of November. Isolated cases and outbreaks were reported around the same time and into the weeks of December. On 12 December, the CDC reported cases in five cities: Memphis; Kansas City, Kansas; Baltimore; Anchorage; and Seattle. By 23 December, influenza had been documented in 14 states, and significant outbreaks were occurring in New York City, Baltimore, and the San Francisco Bay Area.

By 13 January 1973, 18 states had documented cases of influenza, with only sporadic cases occurring elsewhere. Activity peaked in the mid-Atlantic and Pacific areas in early January, with a subsequent rise in excess mortality above the epidemic threshold for two or more weeks in mid-January. California was evidently the hardest-hit state by this point, with mortality approaching the epidemic threshold in the 11 largest cities of northern California.

The epidemic reportedly aggravated an ongoing shortage of blood at this time in places such as Baltimore and New York City.

As activity in the northeast declined in the second half of January, cases began to rise in the Southeastern United States and the Midwestern United States, peaking in the middle of February. On 2 February, the CDC reported that the country had surpassed 1,000 deaths from influenza and pneumonia; by 9 February, the figure had risen to over 4,300 deaths since the beginning of the year.

The epidemic had begun to wane by the first week of March, with excess mortality declining throughout February and falling below the epidemic threshold for the first time by 9 March. In total, excess mortality from pneumonia and influenza was the highest since the 1968–1969 flu season and the initial introduction of the pandemic virus into the US. California alone reported at least 1,083 deaths in its major cities. The National Center for Health Statistics attributed 18,300 all-cause excess deaths to this flu season, though subsequent studies identified at least 21,400 and as many as 29,200 all-cause excess deaths.

=== International reports ===
The World Health Organization reported outbreaks also in the Soviet Union, the Netherlands, Switzerland, Morocco and Lebanon, with localized outbreaks in four other countries.

== Analysis ==
Subsequent statistical analysis indicated that by the following season (1973–1974), influenza type B was predominating over type A strains by a factor approaching 4:1.
