= Hong Kong flu =

1968–70 flu pandemic

- Disease: Influenza
- Pathogen: H3N2 strain of Influenza A virus
- Dates: 1968–70
- Deaths: 1–4 million (estimated)
- Fatality rate: 0.2%

The Hong Kong flu, also known as the 1968 flu pandemic, was an influenza pandemic that occurred between 1968 and 1970 and which killed between one and four million people globally. It is among the deadliest pandemics in history, and was caused by an H3N2 strain of the influenza A virus. The virus was descended from H2N2 (which caused the Asian flu pandemic in 1957–1958) through antigenic shift, a genetic process in which genes from multiple subtypes are reassorted to form a new virus.

== History ==
=== Origin and outbreak in Hong Kong and China ===
The first recorded instance of the outbreak appeared on 13th July 1968 in British Hong Kong. It has been speculated that the outbreak began in mainland China before it spread to Hong Kong: On 11th July, before the outbreak in the colony was first noted, the Hong Kong newspaper Ming Pao reported an outbreak of respiratory illness in Guangdong Province, and the next day, The Times issued a similar report of an epidemic in southeastern China. Later reporting suggested that the flu had spread from the central provinces of Sichuan, Gansu, Shaanxi, and Shanxi, which had experienced epidemics in the spring. However, due to a lack of etiological information on the outbreak and a strained relationship between Chinese health authorities and those in other countries at the time, it cannot be ascertained whether the Hong Kong virus was to blame.

The outbreak in Hong Kong reached its maximum intensity in two weeks. The outbreak lasted around six weeks, affecting about 15% of the population (some 500,000 people infected), but the mortality rate was low and the clinical symptoms were mild.

There were two waves of the flu in mainland China, one between July and September in 1968 and the other between June and December in 1970. The reported data were very limited due to the Cultural Revolution, but retrospective analysis of flu activity between 1968 and 1992 shows that flu infection was the most serious in 1968, implying that most areas in China were affected at the time.

=== International spread ===
Despite the lethality of the 1957–1958 pandemic in China, little improvement had been made regarding the handling of such epidemics.

By 13 August, it was clear to virologists that strains isolated from the outbreak in Hong Kong differed markedly from previous strains of influenza. However, they were not at the time considered to be an entirely new subtype of influenza A, only a variant of older strains. Nevertheless, the World Health Organization warned of potential worldwide spread of the virus on 16 August. An outbreak of influenza-like illness in Singapore during the second week of August was the first indication of spread outside of Hong Kong. Around the same time, an outbreak became apparent in the Philippines and Malaysia, and, before the end of the month, an epidemic was underway in the Republic of Vietnam.

In September 1968, the flu reached India, northern Australia, Thailand, and Europe. The same month, the virus entered the United States and was carried by troops returning from the Vietnam War, but it did not become widespread in the country until December 1968.

In the USSR, the first cases of the flu began to appear in mid-December.

It reached South America by 1969.

The development of the pandemic at first resembled that of the 1957 pandemic, which had spread unencumbered throughout the spring and summer and had become truly worldwide by October, by which point nearly all countries were experiencing their first or even second wave. However, the two experiences eventually diverged within a couple of months after their initial outbreaks. In 1968, many countries (e.g., the United Kingdom, Japan) did not immediately see outbreaks despite repeated introductions of the virus throughout August and September. Additionally, after September, there was little evidence of continued spread in new areas, despite similar importations of the virus into those areas. Epidemics did eventually develop during the winter months, but these were often mild (especially when compared to the experience in the United States). In some countries (such as the UK and Japan), it was not until the following winter of 1969–1970 that truly severe epidemics developed.

At the time of the outbreak, the Hong Kong flu was also known as the "Mao flu" or "Mao Tse-tung flu". The name "Hong Kong flu" was not used within the colony, where the press dubbed it the "killer flu" after the first several deaths. Before the end of July, the South China Morning Post predicted that "Fingers of scorn" would be directed at Hong Kong in the coming weeks and stated that the colony had "acted, unwillingly, in our old role as an entrepot for a sneeze". (An outbreak of influenza in Hong Kong had been the first one to occur outside of mainland China during the 1957–1958 pandemic and had been what alerted the rest of the world to the developing situation, when international press began to report on it.)

Denny Huang, a member of the Urban Council of Hong Kong, later decried the widespread adoption of the name "Hong Kong flu", claiming that it was "giving Hong Kong a bad name". He asked why foreign press and health authorities did not refer to it by its "proper name—China flu". China certainly did not escape associations with the new virus, however, as the name "Mao flu" suggests. It was speculated even at the time that the virus had originated from "Red China". These differing names for the flu resulted in some confusion: In January 1969, a British member of parliament asked David Ennals, the Secretary of State for Social Services, "in what way the characteristics of Mao flu can be distinguished from those of Hong Kong flu". In addition to these names, the virus was also often referred to as "Asian flu" or "Asiatic flu", as it was not yet considered an entirely different subtype from the previously circulating influenza A.

Worldwide deaths from the virus peaked in December 1968 and January 1969, when public health warnings and virus descriptions had been widely issued in the scientific and medical journals. Isolated countries like Albania reported the first cases of the flu in December 1969, reaching a peak in infections in the first months of the year 1970. In Berlin, the excessive number of deaths led to corpses being stored in subway tunnels, and in West Germany, garbage collectors had to bury the dead because of a lack of undertakers. In total, East and West Germany registered 60,000 estimated deaths. In some areas of France, half of the workforce was bedridden, and manufacturing suffered large disruptions because of absenteeism. The UK postal and rail services were also severely disrupted.

==== Asia ====
===== India =====
On 8 September 1968, the ship S.S. Rajula docked at Madras (present-day Chennai) from Singapore, where influenza had been epidemic the month before. On board were 16 people who were suspected to have influenza infections, a number of which were confirmed to be caused by the pandemic virus. On 9 September, only eight cases of typical influenza were reported in city hospitals, but by 17 September the number had reached 7,661, after which incidence of the disease declined to just 68 cases on 31 October.

The epidemic thereafter spread throughout Madras State. Pandemic influenza was reported in Chengalpattu, Kanchipuram, Pondicherry, Vellore, Coimbatore, and the Nilgiris district during the second half of September; in Madurai, Tiruppur, Karur, Tiruchirappalli, Thanjavur, and Palani during the first half of October; and in Tirunelveli, Ramanathapuram, and Salem during the middle and second half of October. The epidemic then declined in the latter part of November and December.

Although the epidemic in Madras State seemed to originate from Madras upon the arrival of S.S. Rajula, two strains of the pandemic virus were in fact isolated at the end of August elsewhere, namely Coonoor and Ooty, suggesting that the virus had likely already been seeded prior to its apparent importation from Singapore on 8 September.

Concurrent with the outbreak in Madras State was a moderate epidemic in Bombay (present-day Mumbai), which began the second week of September and subsided in October.

There was a recurrence of influenza in December 1969, when a "considerable increase" in the disease was reported in several states.

===== Iran =====
During the second week of September, nearly 2000 participants from 92 countries, including some in southeast Asia where the flu was epidemic, met in Tehran for the Eighth International Congresses on Tropical Medicine and Malaria. An outbreak of influenza soon erupted among the participants, afflicting at least a third of them. The convention was the apparent origin of a broader outbreak within the capital city, which thereafter spread rapidly throughout Iran.

===== Japan =====
The virus entered Japan repeatedly throughout August and September via importations from Hong Kong and other countries already afflicted, but these introductions did not spark any larger outbreak. The first "true epidemic" began in early October, confined almost entirely to school settings. It was not until January 1969 that the outbreak began to develop the typical features of an epidemic among the general population, although it remained moderate in its extent and spread less rapidly than expected for an outbreak of a novel influenza virus. The epidemic was reported to be still increasing on 6 February, spreading from the larger cities into the smaller cities, towns, and villages, though the rural areas were relatively less affected. By 13 March, the epidemic had mostly subsided within the large cities.

During this same period, an epidemic of influenza B affected the whole country, including rural parts. For this reason, it is difficult to ascertain the extent to which the pandemic virus and the seasonal B virus each contributed to the general wave of influenza-like illness that occurred between January and February 1969.

A second pandemic wave developed in Japan towards the end of November 1969 and subsided in January 1970. This outbreak was more localized within the east of the middle part of the country, around Tokyo. Like that in many countries of Europe, the second wave in Japan was more severe than the first. While the 1968–1969 wave saw excess pneumonia and influenza and all-cause mortality rates of 5.4 and 27.0 per 100,000, respectively, the 1969–1970 wave saw rates of 11.3 and 49.1 per 100,000, respectively. In sum, approximately two thirds of the total pandemic mortality occurred over the winter of 1969–1970.

==== Oceania ====
===== Australia =====
The pandemic reached Australia in September 1968, resulting in a severe epidemic among the general population of the Northern Territory; however, no further outbreaks were reported elsewhere until the following year. Generally mild outbreaks began to be reported in mid-May 1969. In Melbourne, influenza broke out in the suburbs in mid-June, developing into an epidemic that peaked about 20 July and had subsided by mid-August. In Sydney, the disease broke out at the beginning of July and continued into August. Another epidemic, more widespread and severe than the first, afflicted the Northern Territory in 1969.

Australia experienced another pandemic wave in 1970, reportedly more widespread than that of 1969. Queensland saw a widespread epidemic of high incidence between 1 June and early July. Between 10 June and mid-August, a widespread epidemic, also of high incidence, affected New South Wales, particularly Sydney. A moderate outbreak driven by the pandemic virus alongside other respiratory viruses affected Victoria between mid-June and August, followed by a secondary outbreak, involving some influenza B, that subsided in mid-September. For the third year in a row, the Northern Territory experienced an epidemic of the pandemic virus, though the disease was less severe than in 1968 and 1969.

Similar to Japan and countries in Europe, Australia in general experienced a more severe second wave of the pandemic as compared with the first. While the first wave of 1969 produced excess pneumonia and influenza and all-cause mortality rates of 4.0 and 23.5 per 100,000, respectively, the second wave resulted in excess mortality rates of 14.1 and 63.8 per 100,000, respectively.

===== Territory of Papua and New Guinea =====
In 1968, the Territory of Papua and New Guinea became aware of the possibility of an influenza epidemic after the first appearance of the virus in Australia late in the year, but no such epidemic ultimately occurred. As the disease spread throughout the Pacific region and around the world, the Territory's Department of Health took the opportunity to observe the situation in other countries and ensure treatment services were available to respond to outbreaks in rural areas.

The disease first appeared in the Territory in late May 1969 but resulted in only a small outbreak within coastal centers. Although the outbreak subsided in June, flu cases continued to build up, with 252 reported in July and 407 in August.

In August, the South Pacific Games were held in Port Moresby from the 13th to the 23th and later the Mount Hagen Show was held in the Western Highlands on the 30th and 31st. These two events, the latter seeing an attendance of nearly 100,000 people, were likely significant in spreading the disease and reigniting the outbreak. On 29 August, pandemic influenza was reported as "raging" in Lae (on New Guinea itself), in Rabaul (on the island of New Britain), and on Bougainville Island. However, the disease was described as mild, with its main symptom being a "very sore" throat. No deaths had thus far been reported.

By mid-September, a "big" influenza epidemic had developed throughout the Western Highlands. At Mount Hagen, the site of the show the month before, nearly one third of its population was reportedly down with the disease. Though flu victims crowded into Mt Hagen Hospital, a number suffering complications from the disease, it took another several weeks before the severity of the epidemic was recognized.

The epidemic raged practically unabated throughout the Highlands, where the disease "spread like wildfire". Later reporting would reveal that most of the 200,000 people living in the Southern Highlands had contracted the flu in late September and early October. At the time, however, the first indication of the seriousness of the outbreak came on 6 October, when the latest field report revealed that over 150 people had died across the Territory during the month of September, 96 in the Southern Highlands alone, with many in remote villages having already been buried. Despite Health Department fears that the true toll could be as high as 300, mass vaccination at this point was considered a pointless exercise, as only the healthy would be immunized. Moreover, field patrols reported that the epidemic was now being brought under control and was "petering out" in the Western and Southern Highlands, and health officials felt confident that the disease would not reach the isolated Sepik and Western Districts.

By 13 October, the death toll had risen to "at least" 235, though unconfirmed reports out of Goroka indicated that the toll had already reached 500 in the Southern Highlands. By the next day, the toll had climbed to 403, 207 in the Southern Highlands, and now health authorities could see no end to the epidemic in the near future. It had reached the Eastern Highlands and Morobe Districts, and it was now expected to reach not only Madang but Sepik as well later in the month. Patrols were on the move into all villages in the Highlands, and extra supplies and personnel were being directed to aid stations in areas of most need.

In a reversal from previous statements, it was announced that 10,000 doses of flu vaccine would now be sent to the Territory, in order to protect those in remote areas that had not yet been affected. With the mounting number of deaths, especially in the Highlands, and the extent of the epidemic across the Territory now clear, the Health Department had contacted the Commonwealth Serum Laboratories to discuss the situation. CSL would send the doses to the Territory as a gift, enough for about 24 hours, and further supplies would come at a later point.

Another 56 deaths were reported from the Highlands on 15 October, bringing the toll to 459. By the next morning, the number had reached 462, and before the end of the day, it was 526. Field reports indicated that the epidemic had already reached the Sepik District, and deaths were reported from the Madang and East Sepik Districts for the first time. It was now clear that not many areas would not remain unaffected. In response to this unexpected severity, it was announced that the Health Department had intensified its efforts to combat the epidemic. These new measures involved alerting and resupplying all aid posts via personal visit, doubling staff at aid posts where the disease was occurring, and continually visiting aid posts over the next several weeks.

On 17 October, it was announced that the Australian Army would be providing Territory health authorities with five helicopters to help in the fight against the disease. The helicopters, previously on survey work, would now be at the complete disposal of the Health Department. Another 100,000 doses of vaccine were also on the way, with the Highlands being the priority. William D. Symes, the first assistant director of health, explained that native people in all the Highland areas not yet affected would be vaccinated, while those in the coastal areas, apparently of greater resistance to the virus, would not. In addition, the Administration on this day informed the Indonesian authorities in West Irian of the epidemic and the actions currently being taken to combat it.

Health authorities, with the help of the Army and its helicopters, spent the weekend distributing and administering vaccine. No new deaths were reported, though Roy Scragg, Director of Public Health, acknowledged reports of further but as of yet unconfirmed deaths. More deaths indeed were soon to be officially reported.

On the morning of 21 October, widespread reports indicated that the death toll from the epidemic had surpassed 1,000, though no confirmation came from the Administration. In the afternoon, it came to be known that the Department of Information and Extension Services would be releasing a statement on flu deaths, but upon being contacted, the Department claimed the information was not available. This was, apparently, because the Department of External Territories first had to approve the release of the information. Territory Administrator David Hay had no comment when asked about this confusion. At last, sometime after 6:30 pm, the updated death toll of 1,455 was released to the public.

This sudden increase in deaths over the week before was not necessarily due to an increase in the severity of the epidemic but rather because reports had finally come in from patrols moving through remote areas, and for the same reason, the death toll was expected to rise again. Still, it was evident that the outbreak was one of the worst to affect the Territory in recent years, now affecting all 18 districts, and it was worsening still in the Southern Highlands, where 600 had died in just three weeks. The Ministerial Member for Public Health, Tore Lokoloko, reported that about 25% of all deaths in that area were of young adults, an unprecedented occurrence in a Territory flu epidemic. In light of these developments, the Administration called for outside aid for the first time. A Royal Australian Air Force aircraft was now on the way to deliver an army hospital to assist medical authorities in their efforts to combat the epidemic.

On 22 October, it was reported that the epidemic would likely cost more than $250,000 in vaccine supplies and drugs alone, while the cost of helicopters and other means to contact people in the immunization campaign was not yet known. By this point, about 160,000 doses of vaccine had been sent to the Territory, and emergency vaccination of 200,000 people would soon begin in the unaffected areas of the Central, Morobe, Madang, Eastern Highlands, and Southern Highlands Districts.

On 23 October, Hay announced that field officers had been asked for urgent reports on any emergency aid needed to fight the epidemic in the Highlands. Hay further announced the establishment of a five-man Epidemic Relief Committee to determine the relief measures required by affected families and to direct aid where needed. The committee, headed by Lokoloko, would in addition consist of Ian Skinner, Director of Civil Defence; Dr. Alan Tarutia, a specialist in preventive medicine; P. Donaldson, an Administration representative; and H. Stubbs, the president of the Territory Red Cross. The committee would begin an inspection tour of the areas hardest hit by the epidemic the following day.

On 24 October, health authorities announced that another 208 deaths had been reported the day before, bringing the total number of deaths to 1,663. Scragg clarified that these deaths had all occurred prior to 20 October but had only just been reported following the return of patrols from remote areas; many were from areas not previously included in the death toll.

In Lae, Dr. C. Matthews, Medical Superintendent of Angau Memorial Hospital, announced that no special precautions would be taken during the upcoming Morobe Show, to be held from Friday the 24th to Sunday the 26th. He explained that all possible precautions had already been taken to immunize people in the villages and that to set up a vaccination program at the show "would be merely doubling up". The alternative, to cancel the show altogether, was considered earlier in the week but was ultimately decided to be unnecessary.

On Monday, health authorities reported another 208 deaths, bringing the death toll now to 1,871; as before, all deaths had occurred before 20 October. Scragg later explained that doctors were trying to distinguish between deaths from before the 20th and those from after, as many of the 1,871 thus far reported had actually occurred up to five or six months before. The next day, it was reported that tests were in process at the Commonwealth Serum Laboratories to determine if a new virus could be responsible for the severity of the epidemic in the Highlands, in particular the disproportionate number of deaths among young adults in the area, similar to what had originally happened in Hong Kong the year before, when the pandemic virus was first detected.

After the report of the first case of influenza in the Tari area of the Southern Highlands on 24 October, Administration officials and staff worked to seal off mountain passes between the area and infected parts on the other side. A few days later, it was announced that a center to investigate the best way to treat flu-related complications would be established at Tari, in particular the effectiveness of a long-acting penicillin as compared with normal treatments. As part of the study, 1,500 people would be injected with the long-acting penicillin while another 1,500 would receive penicillin only after complications had developed, as is typically done. If the new penicillin proved effective, medical staff would only need to administer the drug once during an epidemic rather than have to return to villages constantly.

Lokoloko and the rest of the Epidemic Relief Committee returned to Port Moresby on 29 October following their inspection tour of the Highlands. They reported that some areas of the Highlands were experiencing a severe food shortage, in particular around Pangia, at the eastern end of the Southern Highlands. While adults there typically consumed nearly 11 lbs of kaukau (sweet potato) per day, some were now subsisting on as little as 6 oz per day, and a few had not eaten anything for several days. In response the committee arranged for 10 tons of rice and two tons of fish to be sent to the area at once, and shipments of the same amounts would continue periodically until new gardens began producing food. In addition, it was reported that requests for blankets and other warm clothing had come in from many areas. Hay approved the program to send the needed supplies to affected areas the following day.

On 30 October, the Director of the Commonwealth Serum Laboratories, William R. Lane, announced that tests performed on virus samples isolated from the epidemic showed that the strain responsible was in fact the Hong Kong flu and not a novel virus. Scragg expressed his relief at this news, as that was the type for which medical officers had been treating the people of the Territory.

The next day, Scragg announced that the epidemic death toll had reached 1,980 but that the worst now appeared to be over. Of the new deaths reported, 42 had occurred since 20 October, across Morobe, Madang, and the Southern Highlands. He reported that the situation in the Southern Highlands was now under control. On 3 November, it was reported that the Army units that had been helping in the fight against the epidemic were beginning to move out, though some would remain and be moved around mostly to assist in vaccination rather than treating the sick.

On 7 November, Scragg reported a further 33 deaths due to the epidemic since 20 October, bringing the death toll to 2,013. In total, only 75 deaths had been reported since that date, and Scragg stated that the death rate due to pneumonia and influenza appeared to have returned to normal levels in the affected areas. The disease was still occurring in some small pockets, but few deaths were being reported. Dr. A. L. Malcolm, the Regional Medical Director at Lae, reported that the epidemic appeared to have paused and that officers were now waiting to see how it would continue.

No further deaths were reported over the weekend, it was announced on 10 November. Now, senior Health Department and Army officials were moving into the field to visit affected areas and to decide when the Army could pull out and the Department could effectively take control of the epidemic response. On 11 November, the Army continued its pullout from the Highlands, with most Army medics set to move out on the 15th. However, some forces would remain in West Sepik and other areas of Sepik for the time being. In response to these developments, Scragg stated that this withdrawal of the Army was a definite indication that the epidemic was on the decline and that the Administration was now able to handle it on its own.

On 13 November, Lokoloko addressed the House of Assembly regarding the influenza epidemic. He described the outbreak in the Southern Highlands as "a major disaster" and explained the necessity of the assistance from the armed forces. He further recounted how the Health Department had prepared for the epidemic and why vaccination had been advised against at first but then later recommended. He explained health officers' view on why the Southern Highlands had suffered so severely in comparison with other areas. In short, this was due to the low temperatures of the Highland plateaus, malnutrition, the people not seeking medical attention when it could have been provided, and widespread sickness that incapacitated whole families at the same time. He reported that about 2,000 had died in September and October out of the one million people living in the Highlands, though it was not possible to know for sure how many had died from the epidemic. He described the experience of one area where the number of deaths reported was twice the number that had actually occurred in September and October, and some deaths were in fact from up to two years before. Nonetheless, he asserted that despite these issues in reporting, the number of deaths due to pneumonia and influenza was undoubtedly at least twice the number to occur normally over the same period.

On 17 November, Lokoloko spoke further regarding the epidemic. In response to fellow House member Matiabe Yuwe of Tari, Lokoloko reported that Administration spending on the campaign to fight the epidemic had totaled $400,000 but that total spending was not known. He attributed this figure to the involvement of the Army, the Air Force, and other Administration Departments.

On 27 November, it was announced that Pope Paul VI had donated $5,000 for victims of the epidemic. Archbishop Virgil Patrick Copas, who received the letter about the donation, expressed his intent to get in touch with the Administration and churches ("not just Catholic") in areas that have been most affected.

On 18 December, Reuben Taureka, Highlands Regional Medical Officer, announced in Goroka that the influenza epidemic in the Highlands had concluded. At a meeting of the Southern Highlands District Advisory Council on 6 January 1970, Fr. Berard Tomasetti of Pureni moved a vote of thanks to those who had helped in the fight against the epidemic in the Highlands.

==== Europe ====
===== France =====
Pandemic influenza was first noted in France in the latter half of January 1969, with sporadic cases appearing in the district of Paris. It thereafter spread throughout the rest of the country, though incidence of the disease remained low and moderate in extent. In many areas only sporadic cases were noted, although there were some localized outbreaks reported in towns and villages. The outbreak reached its peak in March, began to decline in April, and subsided in May.

The disease was generally mild or moderate in severity. Although some months saw greater mortality than the corresponding periods of 1967 and 1968, the total number of reported deaths due to influenza during the first 4 months of 1969 was only 3186, as compared with 3472 and 7267 in 1967 and 1968, respectively. Excess pneumonia and influenza and all-cause mortality rates in 1968–1969 were 6.2 and 21.8 per 100,000, respectively, as opposed to 16.6 and 58.9 per 100,000, respectively, in 1967–1968.

Influenza reappeared in France about mid-November 1969, originating in the southwest. It then spread throughout the entire country, peaked around the new year, and subsided in the second half of January. In contrast to the previous winter, the incidence of disease during the second wave was high, although the disease itself remained mild or moderate in its presentation. Nonetheless, as in other European countries, the second wave resulted in greater mortality in France as compared with the first, with excess pneumonia and influenza and all-cause mortality rates of 35.3 and 71.5 per 100,000, respectively. Death rates were generally greater in the southwest of the country and lower in the north.

===== Italy =====
Pandemic influenza was not detected in Italy until the last week of February 1969, from a case in Genova. The country saw only sporadic cases of respiratory illness in the winter of 1968–1969, and there was ultimately no epidemic that first pandemic season.

The disease began to spread with force in late November 1969, around the time that the Apollo 12 crew returned to Earth; for this reason, some Italians humorously designated the outbreak "the moon flu". By 9 December, a "fairly large epidemic" had spread throughout the country, afflicting an estimated 15 million persons, with an estimated 1.5 million cases, or about half its population, in Rome alone, including Prime Minister Mariano Rumor. Upwards of 20 to 25 million Italians were reported to be infected by the end of the year, around which time the national epidemic reached its peak. The disease subsided in February 1970.

Like other European countries, Italy experienced a more severe outbreak in the second pandemic season than in the first. In fact, Italy seems to have been affected even more severely during the winter of 1969–1970 as compared with other European countries during the same period, with excess mortality rates approximately 1-fold higher than those elsewhere in the region. Ultimately an estimated 20,000 Italians died due to pneumonia and influenza and an estimated 57,000 died from all causes in excess of the expected numbers during the winter of 1969–1970.

===== Netherlands =====
An epidemic among the general population of the Netherlands began on 22 December 1968 and was reported as decreasing as of 15 February 1969. Health officials estimated the attack rate during the epidemic to have been about 30%, though influenza B was also prevalent at the time. The disease was generally mild; however, it resulted in excess mortality nearly equal to that during the epidemic of 1967–1968. Unlike that epidemic, however, younger age groups were more vulnerable to infection, and the age distribution of deaths was about the same as in 1957.

Another widespread epidemic occurred the following year, beginning during the second half of December 1969, peaking during the week of 4–10 January 1970, and subsiding during the second week of February. Incidence of the disease was high, and the case fatality rate was higher than usual. This pandemic experience was unlike that in many other European countries, where the first wave was relatively mild or hardly occurred at all while the second wave was considerably more widespread and severe.

===== Poland =====
The first cases of pandemic influenza occurred in Poland in December 1968, though it was not until mid-January 1969 that an outbreak of very high morbidity began among the general population, in contrast to most other European countries during the winter of 1968–1969. By late February, the epidemic was on the decline. In total an estimated 3–4 million cases of influenza-like illness occurred during the first wave in Poland, with nearly 500,000 in Warsaw alone.

Beginning in early January 1970, a second nationwide epidemic occurred in Poland. The disease was reported to be generally mild, although there were some complications, at times fatal; such complications occurred more frequently than during the typical influenza season.

===== Spain =====
Up to 5 March 1969, there was no epidemic among the general population of Spain, nor were there any reports to the World Health Organization of sporadic cases, localized outbreaks, or virus isolations. During the last week of February 1969, however, the pandemic virus did appear in Barcelona, with an outbreak soon following. It peaked in late March and subsided at the beginning of May. The epidemic began in the city and thereafter spread to towns, villages, and rural areas, ultimately affecting the whole province. The disease was on the whole mild, with a very low death rate.

Spain was the first country to report the recurrence of the pandemic in Europe. The disease broke out again in early October 1969, evidently first in Madrid and later in the northern parts of the country, in particular Lugo and Navarre. The epidemic peaked during the month of November and was over by 27 December. On the whole, the disease was again generally mild, though pneumonia was a more frequent complication than usual.

===== United Kingdom =====
The pandemic virus was first isolated in early August 1968 from a 23-month-old child in London with no known contact with any recent arrivals from the Far East. Isolated cases continued throughout the autumn, with a few localized outbreaks but no extensive spread in the general population. The first community outbreaks were reported towards the end of the year and became more frequent in January and February 1969.

The course of the epidemic in Great Britain can be tracked by looking at sickness benefit claims and consultation rates for clinically diagnosed influenza-like illness. The number of new claims increased sharply the first week of 1969 but only reached just over 300,000 in a single week, as compared with the peak of 485,000 seen during the 1967–1968 epidemic of H2N2. New claims increased again in early February and continued until mid-April but only reached 352,000. As for consultation rates for influenza-like illness, the rate peaked at 420 per 100,000 at the end of February 1969, but, similar to the sickness benefit claims, was far below the comparable figure for the previous year, which was 514 per 100,000.

Northern Ireland experienced a moderate outbreak of pandemic influenza in February and March 1969, but morbidity and mortality were both considerably lower than during the last major epidemic in the winter of 1965–1966. On the whole, the first wave of the pandemic in the United Kingdom was unusually long, lasting over three months, and resulted in no significant demands upon general medical practitioners or hospital services.

Speculation of a recurrence the following autumn began almost as soon as the first outbreak had subsided in the spring. The virus indeed reappeared in October 1969 on the Isle of Lewis, Scotland, and in November 1969 in Southern England, without evidence of local spread. Soon thereafter, however, in early December, sickness benefit claims began to rise sharply. In Birmingham, hospital admissions were restricted to emergency cases in December due to so many sick doctors and nurses. On 16 December, hospitals in London went on a yellow alert, stopping all but urgent admissions; on 27 December, the alert shifted to red, with only the most urgent flu cases being given beds. By the end of the year, emergency flu cases in the city had reached their highest level in seven years.

The epidemic interfered with English football, requiring several matches to be postponed. Three League matches set to be held on 20 December and three set for 3 January 1970 were called off due to sickness on the teams, while four FA Cup matches set for 3 January also had to be delayed.

Sickness benefit claims peaked at nearly 750,000 the first week of 1970, exceeding the peak of the 1957 pandemic. Consultation rates for influenza-like illness behaved similarly, peaking at 1,260 per 100,000 the last week of 1969 and the first week of 1970. Ultimately the wave subsided quickly, after just about six weeks, and was over by the end of January.

In general, the United Kingdom saw a more severe second wave of the pandemic as compared with the first, as in other European countries, Japan, and Australia. The number of weekly deaths due to influenza, pneumonia, and bronchitis in Great Britain remained relatively low during the winter of 1968–1969, peaking at 2,550 as compared with over 5,300 the winter before. Excess deaths due to influenza stood at 1,000 and those due to influenza, bronchitis, and pneumonia reached 12,000, while all-cause excess mortality was 31,000. In contrast, during the winter of 1969–1970, deaths due to influenza, bronchitis, and pneumonia increased dramatically, peaking at over 10,500. Excess deaths due to influenza were 10,000 and those due to influenza, bronchitis, and pneumonia were 32,000, while all-cause excess mortality was 47,000.

==== North America ====
===== Canada =====
Canada experienced an epidemic among the general population that began in December 1968 and was reported as decreasing on 14 February 1969. It was, on the whole, "much less severe" than the concurrent epidemic in the United States. This relative moderateness was attributed at the time to the recent epidemic of 1967–1968 as well as the happenstance of timing, as the increase in cases was interrupted by the holiday period.

Between mid-January and mid-March 1970, there was an increased incidence and localized outbreaks of pandemic influenza in all regions except the north, though incidence remained generally low. There was, however, an epidemic in all of Newfoundland Province. Later, between the third week of March and April, there was an outbreak of influenza A in Coral Harbour in the Northwest Territories, though the exact subtype was not specified.

On the whole the two waves were more balanced in Canada, with the first only slightly more severe than the second, which could be explained by the more heterogeneous local activity in Canada as compared with the United States, whose first wave was significantly more severe than its second.

===== Guatemala =====
A rise in influenza-like illness was reported in Guatemala in the early weeks of 1969, reaching a peak during the week ending 22 March before declining. Due to a lack of laboratory facilities, the exact cause could not be identified, but the disease was considered to represent pandemic influenza.

Cases increased again in late July 1969. After a brief decrease, cases again increased until the week ending 4 October, when they then declined. Serology tests at this time indicated pandemic influenza. However, some cases of illness diagnosed in late July and early August might actually have been Venezuelan equine encephalitis (VEE), which was at that time epidemic and epizootic. The later increase was very likely due to influenza, however.

===== Mexico =====
Mexico reported its first major attack of pandemic influenza in the winter of 1969–1970, in Mexico City, where 35–40% of the population was affected. It began in the second half of November 1969, peaked in December, and then subsided in January 1970. Some other areas were also affected, though incidence was more moderate. The disease was reported to be moderately severe, with more deaths than expected in the elderly, children, and other adult age groups.

===== Panama =====
Isolated cases of pandemic influenza were reported in October 1968 in the Panama Canal Zone, at this time a concession of the United States. An epidemic among the general population of the Canal Zone began 8 June 1970, peaking 1 July and subsiding that same month. There was a high incidence of disease, with bacterial complications reported. An epidemic among the general population of Panama as a whole began around the same time, in June 1970.

===== Puerto Rico =====
An epidemic among the general population of Puerto Rico was first recognized on 7 September 1968. Several small outbreaks were later reported in November 1969, but incidence remained low.

===== United States =====
After a major epidemic of H2N2 during the 1967–1968 flu season that resulted in outbreaks in all but four states, the National Communicable Disease Center (today the Centers for Disease Control and Prevention) in June 1968 forecasted little or no activity in the United States during 1968–1969. The vaccines for the upcoming season would incorporate the then-circulating seasonal flu strains, and the CDC's recommendations for their use extended mainly to individuals in older age groups (over the age of 45) and the chronically ill.

Following the outbreak in Hong Kong and the recognition that it had been caused by a new variant of influenza, the CDC on 4 September revised its prediction for the 1968–1969 season. An extensive outbreak across the country was now more likely. It repeated more strongly its recommendation that existing vaccines go only to those at highest risk and recommended vaccinating or revaccinating this group once the monovalent vaccine specific to the new variant became available.

The first cases of the virus were reported in Atlanta on 2 September. The first was a Marine Corps major returning from Vietnam, who fell ill four days after arriving back in the US. Two days later, his wife, who had not left the country, fell ill as well. The first outbreak occurred in a Marine Corps school in San Diego that same week. Before the end of the week, influenza surveillance was heightened all across the country, and summaries of the data were thereafter reported regularly by the CDC each week in its Morbidity and Mortality Weekly Report. Further outbreaks among military personnel with connections to southeast Asia were soon to follow during the middle of September.

Isolated cases, mostly in those recently returning from the Far East, seeded the virus across the country throughout September. The first outbreaks in the civilian population occurred in late September and in October, and activity increased markedly throughout November, affecting 21 states by Thanksgiving.

The epidemic became widespread in December, involving all 50 states before the end of the year. Outbreaks occurred in colleges and hospitals, in some places the disease attacking upwards of 40% of their populations. Reports of absenteeism among students and nurses grew. Schools in Los Angeles, for example, reported rates ranging from 10% to 25%, compared to a typical 5% or 6%. The Greater New York Hospital Association reported absenteeism of 15–20% among staff and urged its members to impose visitor restrictions to safeguard patients.

Institutions in many states dismissed their students early for the holidays. In New York and many other areas, holiday sales suffered mid-December, which affected retailers blamed on the flu epidemic (though inflation could have contributed to this as well). Economic activity was also hampered by high levels of industrial absenteeism.

On 18 December, it was reported that President Johnson had been hospitalized at Bethesda Naval Hospital with flu-like symptoms, but whether the new variant was the cause of his illness was not made clear. He returned to the White House on 22 December. Vice President Humphrey was also reported to be ailing from the flu on the day Johnson's condition was revealed. Flu-like illness kept other senior governmental officials from their posts around this time, such as National Security Advisor Walt Rostow, Deputy White House Press Secretary Tom Johnson, and chairman of the Joint Chiefs of Staff General Earle Wheeler. On 23 December, it was reported that President-elect Nixon had been ill with the flu at his daughter's wedding the day before. Nixon later claimed that "the wedding cured the flu."

Peak influenza activity for most states most likely occurred in the latter half of December or early January, but the exact week was impossible to determine due to the holiday season. Activity declined throughout January. Excess pneumonia-influenza mortality passed the epidemic threshold during the first week of December and increased rapidly over the next month, peaking in the first half of January. It took until late March for mortality to return to normal levels. There was no second wave during this season.

Following the epidemic of influenza A, outbreaks of influenza B began in late January and continued until late March. Mostly elementary-school children were affected. This influenza B activity fit within the pattern of epidemics every three to six years, but the 1968–1969 flu season became the first documented instance of two major influenza A epidemics to occur in successive seasons.

Given the widespread epidemic levels of influenza A activity in 1968–1969, the CDC in June 1969 predicted little more than "sporadic cases" of influenza A in the 1969–1970 season. Influenza activity was indeed less than the preceding season, but there was "considerably more" than expected. The flu affected 48 states the following season but was widespread in only six, compared to 44 out of the 50 states in which activity was reported in 1968–1969.

In October 1969, the CDC, alongside Emory University, collaborated with the WHO to host an international conference on the novel influenza in Atlanta. A wide range of topics was discussed, including the origin and path of the pandemic, the experiences of individual countries, and effective control measures, such as vaccination.

==== South America ====
===== Argentina =====
Isolated cases of pandemic influenza were reported in Argentina in December 1968, though no large-scale outbreak occurred until mid-May 1969. The country experienced a widespread epidemic that year that lasted about 18 weeks and consisted of two waves, the first caused by the pandemic virus and the second caused by influenza B.

A widespread epidemic of high incidence and severe disease affected Córdoba beginning 10 July 1970, after a first outbreak in June. It peaked 8 August and subsided 10 September. In Buenos Aires, an epidemic of moderate incidence began at the end of June and subsided in July.

===== Chile =====
Chile experienced a severe outbreak, mainly in Santiago and the central provinces, beginning in late May. It peaked during the week of 20–27 July, with deaths nearly double those of June, and declined during August. Influenza was observed clinically in the southern provinces in August and September. Overall the outbreak was not as severe as in 1957.

There was a slight increase in influenza between July and August 1970 in Santiago and its suburbs, but incidence remained low.

===== Venezuela =====
Venezuela reported isolated cases of pandemic influenza on 4 January 1969, though no outbreak was reported until later that year, when incidence began to increase in December 1969, particularly in Caracas, before subsiding in February 1970. Overall, incidence remained low to moderate.

==== Africa ====
The incidence of the first wave of the pandemic varied considerably across the African continent. Different studies used different methods to determine influenza activity (paired serology, single serology, influenza-like illness), so these data may not be directly comparable.

Pandemic influenza was first reported in West Africa: The Gambia saw a peak between November 1968 and March 1969, while Senegal saw increased activity between July and September 1969. North Africa potentially saw a peak in December 1968, based on data from Egypt. In East Africa, activity increased in Sudan from February 1969 through June 1969, while Kenya, Tanzania, and Uganda saw an increase from April 1969 to August 1969. Finally, epidemic activity in South Africa began about mid-March 1969 and peaked between May and June.

East Africa experienced a second wave approximately coincident with that in the northern hemisphere, lasting from October 1969 to February 1970 in Kenya, Tanzania, and Uganda, while activity lasted into June 1970 in Sudan. In North Africa, data from Algeria suggest activity began to rise in November 1969, and data from Egypt suggest the peak occurred in January 1970. In West Africa, the Gambia did not see activity until between March and November 1970.

In general, pandemic activity in North, West, and East Africa in 1968 and 1969 lagged behind that observed in Europe, while in South Africa, it preceded activity in Australia by one month.

The available data suggest that the 1968 pandemic, in particular its second wave, may have had a significant impact on the public health of African populations, despite the general characterization of the pandemic as having been mild compared to 1918 or 1957.

=== Vaccine ===
It became apparent once the extent of antigenic variation in the virus was recognized that a new vaccine would be needed to protect against it. However, production of the previously recommended vaccines in the US had concluded by July 1968, and supply of fertilized chicken eggs, in which flu vaccines are grown, was limited. The first cultures of the virus were provided to manufacturers in August by the Division of Biologics of the National Institutes of Health for preliminary study. A strain isolated in Japan was sent to the US and, after showing greater potential for vaccine production, was given to manufacturers on 9 September.

In 1968, American microbiologist Maurice Hilleman was head of the virus and vaccination research programs at the pharmaceutical firm Merck & Co., one of the licensed vaccine manufacturers in the US. Hilleman, as the director of the Department of Respiratory Diseases at the Army Medical School (now the Walter Reed Army Institute of Research), had foreseen the 1957 pandemic and kickstarted vaccine production then. He was similarly instrumental in the development of the 1968 pandemic vaccine and, with the use of the Japanese strain, helped initiate early production. Merck would go on to produce over 9 million of the nearly 21 million doses of vaccine produced. The other half was produced together by Eli Lilly & Co., Lederle Laboratories, Parke Davis & Co., the National Drug Company, and Wyeth Laboratories. All of these except Wyeth had been involved in the production of the 1957 vaccine.

On 15 November, 66 days after the production strain became available, the first batch of 110,000 doses of vaccine was released, most of which went to the Armed Forces. This represented a quicker turnaround than the release of the first doses of the 1957 vaccine, which took three months after its production strain became available. At this time, the flu was spreading fast around the country. There was much interest within the press and among public figures in the vaccine. On 18 November, the Pharmaceutical Manufacturers Association announced that 17.5 million doses would be available for civilian use but said that "substantial quantities" would only come after the New Year. By the end of the year, over 10 million doses had been released. At this point, influenza was widespread in the country.

Notably, the crew of Apollo 8 received the vaccine on 3 December prior to their mission later in the month. President Johnson received "two types" of vaccine prior to his bout of flu in December, but it is not clear if one of these was the pandemic vaccine. Johnson, 60 at the time, was in poor health and had been hospitalized several times during his presidency. He thus would have been prioritized for vaccine given the CDC recommendations, even outside of being the president.

Lots of vaccine continued to be released throughout January 1969, with nearly 21 million doses available by the end of the month. By this point, however, influenza activity and subsequent mortality had already peaked. Demand for the vaccine diminished and a considerable surplus remained. Given the time it took to build up antibodies, it is unlikely a significant number of people were effectively immunized to alter the course of the epidemic. Hilleman himself would later acknowledge that the vaccine was "too little and too late" for most of the country. However, it was estimated that a "considerably higher" proportion of the recommended priority group of older and chronically ill persons received the pandemic vaccine than in 1957. Nevertheless, even after the foul-up associated with the vaccination effort in 1957, US health officials by 1968 still had "no meaningful information regarding [influenza vaccine's] actual distribution", such as "to what extent it actually reaches persons at highest risk."

Following the epidemic in the US, leftover vaccine was made available for the southern hemisphere and parts of Europe where the main outbreak had not yet happened. The Japanese strain of the new variant was incorporated into the bivalent vaccines recommended for the 1969–1970 flu season in the US.

Outside the US, vaccination efforts were undertaken in many countries in anticipation of an epidemic. In contrast to US policy, Japan had, since 1963, carried out mass vaccination campaigns against influenza every year regardless of whether an epidemic was expected. This began with the immunization of all children in kindergartens and primary and secondary schools followed by the vaccination of those working in crowded conditions. Enough vaccine was produced each year to vaccinate about 24 million people (nearly a quarter of Japan's population at this time), and this became the goal in 1968, targeting the same priority groups as in a typical flu season.

The same Japanese strain used for vaccine production in the US was immediately sent out to the seven manufacturing firms in Japan. It was soon decided a bivalent vaccine consisting of two parts the new variant and one part influenza B would be produced, in contrast to the US's use of monovalent vaccine. The objective was also set that enough vaccine to immunize about 12 million people would be produced by the end of October, with the hope of at least vaccinating children to guard against an epidemic developing out of schools. After some delay, the mass vaccination campaign was nearly completed before the end of the year.

Yugoslavia received the Japanese strain in mid-October and immediately began experimental trials prior to large-scale production. During this time before the new vaccine was ready, 1.5 million doses of seasonal influenza A vaccine were distributed for use. Ten million doses of the pandemic vaccine had been produced by mid-January 1969, and nearly 1 million people were immunized before the end of February. About 100,000 doses were designated for the mass immunization of schoolchildren.

In Denmark, the influenza department at the governmental Statens Serum Institut produced about 200,000 doses of pandemic vaccine during the winter of 1968–1969, incorporating a strain isolated in Stockholm. There were no particular difficulties in production, but yield was poor.

Millions of doses of vaccine were available in South Africa before its epidemic began at the end of March 1969, which afforded the opportunity to perform "limited studies" of its effectiveness.

By January 1969, vaccine production in Australia was underway at the Commonwealth Serum Laboratories (CSL), then a department of the federal government. The trivalent pandemic vaccine, composed of two influenza A strains and a B strain, was anticipated for release in early March ahead of the winter flu season. The inoculation consisted of a two-dose series, each given four weeks apart.

CSL was aggressive in its promotion of the vaccine, at least to doctors. A spokesman for the laboratories described the new virus as "the worst flu we have had" and called an epidemic that year "almost certain". In light of the situation, the Australian Pensioners Federation in early January wrote to Minister for Health Jim Forbes "demanding" that the vaccine be given free of charge to pensioners. In contrast to CSL's bolder predictions, Forbes described an outbreak that winter as "possible" but did not think it would "necessarily be serious or extensive". While the Department of Health reviewed the question of pandemic vaccine allocation in Australia, the government exported 1 million doses of its vaccine to Britain, already at the peak of its epidemic.

In early February, the epidemiology committee of Australia's National Health and Medical Research Council met in Melbourne to discuss the influenza threat and the best use of vaccine the coming winter. A "serious epidemic" was considered the "strongest possibility", and it was recommended to Forbes that older people, children, and pregnant women receive free immunization against the flu. However, the council advised against a mass vaccination campaign, citing the findings of its study which showed the unreliable protection against infection of the present vaccines, and considered it unwise to vaccinate healthy people while the limited supply could be better used to mitigate severe outcomes in at-risk groups.

On the last day of February, the Pharmaceutical Benefits Advisory Committee met to consider the question of making the pandemic vaccine a pharmaceutical benefit for pensioners. Before the end of the week, Forbes announced that shots would be given for free to all pensioners and their dependents, representing about two-thirds of the three groups recommended for priority immunization. The policy would go into effect starting 1 April.

Vaccination against the flu was recommended beginning 1 March, but issues surrounding availability of vaccine soon became apparent throughout the month. In response to Representative Gordon Scholes of Victoria, who had heard complaints from chemists unable to acquire vaccine, Forbes clarified that bulk orders from larger establishments would be met first. He relayed the expectation of the director of CSL that the present situation would be met once quantities of single doses became available in early April.

In the middle of March, Forbes assured that all medical practitioners would be able to acquire the vaccine by the middle of April. He described the new type of flu as milder than that which Australia had typically seen each year.

Representative Charles Jones of Newcastle later in the month questioned Forbes why his home city's order had not been filled. Forbes revealed the export of 1 million doses to Britain earlier in the year but assured that the order "did not delay, or in any way hinder, [the Commonwealth Serum Laboratories'] capacity to fill Australian orders" and that there would be enough supply to meet expected demand. By this time, 1,755,000 doses had been released, and production continued its pace of 200,000 doses per week.

Despite these assurances from Forbes, the Director General of the Department of Health William Refshauge sent a letter on 9 April to all doctors in the country asking them not to vaccinate healthy people until at-risk groups in the community have been inoculated. Forbes reported meeting with the Commonwealth Serum Laboratories commission to discuss how to speed up distribution of vaccine. Two days later, the director of CSL, William R. Lane, dismissed criticism of the supply situation from the New South Wales branch of the Australian Medical Association as "a lot of nonsense". Contradicting the laboratories' more forceful marketing earlier in the year, he downplayed the likelihood of a serious epidemic but shared the expectation of 4 million doses distributed by the end of May, eight times as much as the average annual total distribution of 500,000 vaccine doses.

On 22 April, Forbes testified in the House of Representatives regarding the vaccine situation. He reported 2.5 million doses had been produced by this time since February. When asked by Representative Theo Nicholls of South Australia to consider importing vaccine to alleviate the present shortage, Forbes noted that the country had already imported the 150,000 doses available. He lamented CSL's recent subjection to a "good deal of abuse" regarding the "temporary shortages" around the country, repeating the comparison between the present production effort and the country's average annual distribution of only 500,000 doses. That same day, N. F. Keith, president of the Victorian branch of the Pharmacy Guild, called on CSL to explain the situation surrounding vaccine supply to the public, which was putting pressure on chemists due to the lack of vaccines.

On 25 April, it was reported that the Department of Health had reimported the remaining vaccine from the order of 1 million that the government had exported to Britain in January. After being sent to Britain, packaged there, and then sent back to Australia, it was sold to doctors at a markup of nearly 50 percent. Doctors criticized the Department and CSL's poor planning with respect to vaccine supply and the decision to export vaccine to Britain when it had already reached the peak of its flu season. They also blamed the shortage on an overreaction by the public, a response which they considered largely due to public statements made by CSL and health officials. The Department later attributed the decision to reimport the vaccine to a desire to ensure a reliable supply for pensioners. It also denied any involvement in the commercial sales of vaccine, in response to reporting on price markups on the reimported vaccine, saying that all it did was authorize the reimportation and list the product as a pharmaceutical benefit. The government itself was paying the same for the reimported vaccine as it was for that being distributed by CSL.

By the end of April, 2.8 million doses of vaccine had been produced and distributed, with no signs of production slowing down. 250,000 doses were now being produced each week, and nearly half a million more were anticipated for 2 May.

A vaccination program was carried out in the Territory of Papua and New Guinea during the epidemic in 1969, though it came about only after the severity of the outbreak became clear.

On 6 October, the latest field reports on the epidemic came in and revealed a death toll of over 150 people, 96 in the Southern Highlands alone. At this stage, however, it was the position of the Territory's Department of Health that there was "no point in any large scale immunisation program". This initial position was based on several factors: the 1969 epidemic in Australia had been relatively mild, immunity acquired by vaccination was of doubtful value and short-lived, the virus itself changed regularly and thus the value of any vaccine could not be known, and influenza vaccine did not prevent illness and most who received it would still get sick. In short, health officials did not expect to see mortality at the level at which it ended up occurring. As more deaths began to be reported, however, a reevaluation of the effectiveness of the vaccine was made in Australia, and reports indicated that it had proved effective in parts there. The Department, accordingly, shifted its position on mass vaccination.

In light of the evolving situation, the Health Department contacted the Commonwealth Serum Laboratories in Melbourne, and the two parties "discussed the situation generally". During this conversation, the suggestion of sending 10,000 doses of vaccine to the Territory was raised. CSL agreed to ship the first supply as a gift, enough for about 24 hours, with further shipments to come later. Charles Barnes, the Minister for External Territories in Australia's House of Representatives, announced this development on 14 October, and CSL commented the following day that the vaccine could save some lives.

On 16 October, the first 10,000 doses arrived in the Territory, with another 100,000 doses coming in the next day. With the help of the Australian Army, health officials began flying the supplies into remote Highland areas. Over the next few days, mass immunizations began, with Army helicopters transporting about 20,000 doses each into the Western, Southern, and Eastern Highlands Districts as well as the Chimbu and Madang Districts; nearly 70,000 doses were sent to Tari, in the Southern Highlands, alone, which had not yet been affected by the epidemic.

By 22 October, 160,000 doses had been sent to the Territory. Ultimately, $308,000 worth of influenza vaccine and other medical supplies were purchased and distributed within 3 weeks. In total, some 340,000 doses of vaccine were given, but its effectiveness in controlling the outbreak was, in the end, not clearly demonstrated. Following this campaign, it was decided that mass vaccination would not be undertaken again in 1970.

=== Post-pandemic ===
The H3N2 virus ultimately displaced the previously circulating H2N2 virus, which first emerged in 1957.

Following the recurrences of 1969–1970, there was a relatively low incidence of influenza the subsequent two global flu seasons, from October 1970 to September 1971. Influenza B was predominant in the north, causing extensive outbreaks in the United States, but minimal in the south. The Hong Kong virus, on the other hand, was responsible for some large outbreaks in the Southern Hemisphere, some most likely occurring in populations that had still not been exposed to the virus.

It was during this period that the city of Coonoor, in India, experienced a "fairly extensive" outbreak, in July 1971. Samples of the virus responsible were collected but their significance was not immediately recognized. The virus did not immediately spread to other countries, or at least did not immediately cause outbreaks, but it was amid an epidemic in England in early 1972, fueled by more original strains, that a variant showing considerable antigenic drift was identified in one isolate tested out of over 700. It ultimately came to be designated A/England/42/72. It was soon recognized, by comparison with the strains isolated then, that this virus had been the one responsible for the epidemic in India.

The novel variant did not immediately spread after that outbreak, and circulating strains largely continued to resemble quite closely the original Hong Kong virus through April 1972. In May, however, at the onset of the flu season in the Southern Hemisphere, epidemics caused by the variant struck Malaysia, Singapore, and Australia, though South Africa and South America were unaffected. The die seemingly cast, the novel variant went on to cause widespread outbreaks in the Northern Hemisphere, by which point US press had dubbed the bug "London flu". It completely replaced the previous strains still resembling the original pandemic virus. In places such as the US and England and Wales, the 1972–1973 flu season was the deadliest since their respective deadliest waves of the pandemic between 1968 and 1970.

Influenza A/H3N2 remains in circulation today as a strain of seasonal flu.

== Clinical data ==
Flu symptoms typically lasted four to five days, but some cases persisted for up to two weeks.

== Virology ==
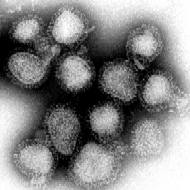
The influenza viruses that caused the Hong Kong flu (magnified approximately 100,000 times)

The Hong Kong flu was the first known outbreak of the H3N2 strain, but there is serologic evidence of H3N1 infections in the late 19th century. The virus was isolated in Queen Mary Hospital.

Soon after the initial outbreak in Hong Kong, the virus responsible was recognized to be antigenically distinct from the current influenza A strain in circulation (which at the time was called "A2") but was generally not considered an entirely new subtype. Analysis using the conventional techniques at the time revealed that it was indeed very different from older A2 viruses but also, at the same time, seemingly related to them, depending on one's reading of the data. Experiments involving newer methods of analysis soon identified another surface antigen, neuraminidase, in addition to hemagglutinin, which had already been recognized. It thus became clear that it was the hemagglutinin that had changed compared to older strains while the neuraminidase was identical. These findings, in part, prompted the World Health Organization in 1971 to revise its system of nomenclature for influenza viruses, taking into consideration both antigens. The novel virus was thereafter designated H3N2, indicating its partial similarity to H2N2 but also its antigenic distinction.

The H3N2 pandemic flu strain contained genes from a low-pathogenicity avian influenza virus. Specifically, it had acquired a new hemagglutinin gene and a new PB1 gene, while it preserved the neuraminidase and five other genes from the preexisting human H2N2 strain. The new hemagglutinin helped H3N2 evade preexisting immunity in humans. It is possible that the new PB1 facilitated viral replication and human-to-human transmission.

The new subtype arose in pigs coinfected with avian and human viruses and was soon transferred to humans. Swine were considered the original "intermediate host" for influenza because they supported reassortment of divergent subtypes. However, other hosts appear capable of similar coinfection (such as many poultry species), and direct transmission of avian viruses to humans is possible. H1N1, associated with the 1918 flu pandemic, may have been transmitted directly from birds to humans.

Accumulated antibodies to the neuraminidase or internal proteins may have resulted in many fewer casualties than most other pandemics. However, cross-immunity within and between subtypes of influenza is poorly understood.

The basic reproduction number of the flu in this period was estimated at 1.80.

== Mortality ==
The estimates of the total death toll due to Hong Kong flu (from its beginning in July 1968 until the outbreak faded during the winter of 1969–70) vary:

- The World Health Organization and Encyclopaedia Britannica estimated the number of deaths due to Hong Kong flu to be between 1 and 4 million globally.
- The United States Centers for Disease Control and Prevention (CDC) estimated that, in total, the virus caused the deaths of 1 million people worldwide.

However, the death rate from the Hong Kong flu was lower than most other 20th-century pandemics. The World Health Organization estimated the case fatality rate of Hong Kong flu to be lower than 0.2%. The disease was allowed to spread through the population without restrictions on economic activity, and a vaccine created by American microbiologist Maurice Hilleman and his team became available four months after it had started. Fewer people died during this pandemic than in previous pandemics for several reasons:

1. Some immunity against the N2 flu virus may have been retained in populations struck by the Asian Flu strains that had been circulating since 1957.
2. The pandemic did not gain momentum until near the winter school holidays in the Northern Hemisphere, thus limiting the infection's spread.
3. Improved medical care gave vital support to the very ill.
4. The availability of antibiotics that were more effective against secondary bacterial infections.

=== By region ===
For this pandemic, there were two geographically distinct mortality patterns. In North America (the United States and Canada), the first pandemic season (1968–1969) was more severe than the second (1969–1970). In the "smoldering" pattern seen in Europe and Asia (United Kingdom, France, Japan, and Australia), the second pandemic season was two to five times more severe than the first. In the United States an estimated 28,100 to 56,300 people died over the winter of 1968–1969; most excess deaths were in those aged 65 and older.
