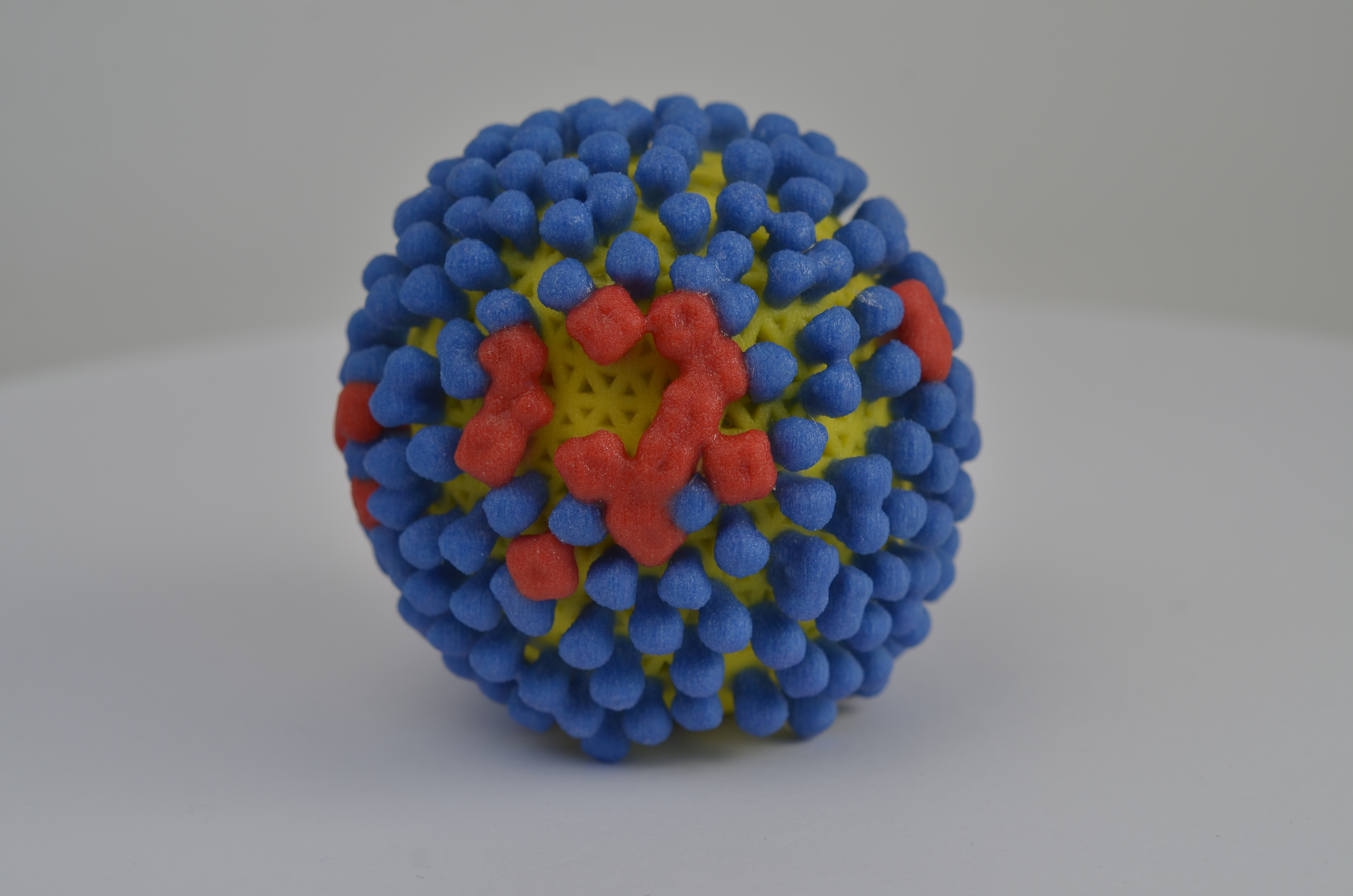

Virus classification
- (unranked): Virus
- Realm: Riboviria
- Kingdom: Orthornavirae
- Phylum: Negarnaviricota
- Class: Insthoviricetes
- Order: Articulavirales
- Family: Orthomyxoviridae
- Genus: Gammainfluenzavirus
- Species: Gammainfluenzavirus influenzae

Synonyms
- Influenza C virus

= Influenza C virus =

Gammainfluenzavirus influenzae

Genus of viruses in the family Orthomyxoviridae

Influenza C virus is the only species in the genus Gammainfluenzavirus, in the virus family Orthomyxoviridae, which like other influenza viruses, causes influenza.

Influenza C viruses are known to infect humans and pigs.

== Influenza C virus ==
Influenza viruses are members of the family Orthomyxoviridae. Influenza viruses A, B, C, and D represent the four antigenic types of influenza viruses. Of the four antigenic types, influenza A virus is the most severe, influenza B virus is less severe but can still cause outbreaks, and influenza C virus is usually only associated with minor symptoms.

Influenza D virus is 50% similar in amino acid composition to influenza C virus, similar to the level of divergence between types A and B, while types C and D have a much greater level of divergence from types A and B. Influenza viruses C and D were estimated to have diverged from a common ancestor over 1,500 years ago, around 482 AD. Influenza viruses A and B are estimated to have diverged from a single ancestor around 4,000 years ago, while the ancestor of influenza viruses A and B and the ancestor of influenza virus C are estimated to have diverged from a common ancestor around 8,000 years ago.

Influenza A virus can infect a variety of animals as well as humans, its main natural reservoir (natural host) is birds. Influenza C infects humans, along with dogs and pigs. Influenza D has so far only been found in pigs and cattle. Influenza C virus is not as easily isolated so less information is known of this type, but studies show that it occurs worldwide. Influenza C virus currently has six lineages, which were estimated to have emerged around 1896 AD.Metatranscriptomics studies also have identified closely related "Influenza C and D-like" viruses in several amphibian and fish species suggesting the potential for divergent influenza C/D like viruses circulating in aquatic systems.

This virus may be spread from person to person through respiratory droplets or by fomites (non-living material) due to its ability to survive on surfaces for short durations. Influenza viruses have a relatively short incubation period (lapse of time from exposure to pathogen to the appearance of symptoms) of 18–72 hours and infect the epithelial cells of the respiratory tract. Influenza virus C tends to cause mild upper respiratory infections. Cold-like symptoms are associated with the virus including fever (38–40 °C), dry cough, rhinorrhea (nasal discharge), headache, muscle pain, and achiness. The virus may lead to more severe infections such as bronchitis and pneumonia.

After an individual becomes infected, the immune system develops antibodies against that infectious agent. This is the body's main source of protection. Most children between five and ten years old have already produced antibodies for influenza virus C. As with all influenza viruses, type C affects individuals of all ages but is most severe in young children, the elderly and individuals with underlying health problems. Young children have less prior exposure and have not developed the antibodies and the elderly have less effective immune systems. Influenza virus infections have one of the highest preventable mortalities in many countries of the world.

== Structure and variation ==
Influenza viruses, like all viruses in the family Orthomyxoviridae, are enveloped RNA viruses with single stranded negative sense RNA genomes. Divergent evolution of the matrix protein (M1) and nucleoprotein (NP), are used to determine if the virus is type A, B, C, or D. The M1 protein is required for virus assembly and NP functions in transcription and replication. These viruses also contain proteins on the surface of the cell membrane called glycoproteins. Type A and B have two glycoproteins: hemagglutinin (HA) and neuraminidase (NA). Type A is divided into subtypes based on distinct differences in the types of these glycoproteins. Types C and D have only one glycoprotein: hemagglutinin-esterase fusion (HEF). These glycoproteins allow for attachment and fusion of viral and cellular membranes. Fusion of these membranes allows the viral proteins and genome to be released into the host cell, which then causes the infection. Types C and D are the only influenza viruses to express the enzyme esterase. This enzyme is similar to the enzyme neuraminidase produced by Types A and B in that they both function in destroying the host cell receptors. Glycoproteins may undergo mutations (antigenic drift) or reassortment in which a new type of HA or NA is produced (antigenic shift). Influenza virus C is only capable of antigenic drift whereas Type A undergoes antigenic shift, as well. When either of these processes occur, the antibodies formed by the immune system no longer protect against these altered glycoproteins. Because of this, viruses continually cause infections.

== Identification ==
Influenza virus C is different from Types A and B in its growth requirements. Because of this, it is not isolated and identified as frequently. Diagnosis is by virus isolation, serology, and other tests. Hemagglutination inhibition (HI) is one method of serology that detects antibodies for diagnostic purposes. Western blot (immunoblot assay) and enzyme-linked immunosorbent assay (ELISA) are two other methods used to detect proteins (or antigens) in serum. In each of these techniques, the antibodies for the protein of interest are added and the presence of the specific protein is indicated by a color change. ELISA was shown to have higher sensitivity to the HEF than the HI test. Because only Influenza viruses C and D produce esterase, In Situ Esterase Assays provide a quick and inexpensive method of detecting just Types C and D. If more individuals were tested for Influenza virus C as well as the other three types, infections not previously associated with Type C may be recognized.

== Vaccination ==
Because influenza virus A has an animal reservoir that contains all the known subtypes and can undergo antigenic shift, this type of influenza virus is capable of producing pandemics. Influenza viruses A and B also cause seasonal epidemics almost every year due to their ability to antigenic shift. Influenza virus C does not have this capability and it is not thought to be a significant concern for human health. Therefore, there are no vaccinations against influenza virus C.
