= Antigenic shift =

Process by which two or more different strains of a virus combine to form a new subtype

NIAID illustration of potential influenza genetic reassortment

Antigenic shift is the process by which two or more different strains of a virus, or strains of two or more different viruses, combine to form a new subtype having a mixture of the surface antigens of the two or more original strains. The term is often applied specifically to influenza, as that is the best-known example, but the process is also known to occur with other viruses, such as visna virus in sheep. Antigenic shift is a specific case of reassortment or viral shift that confers a phenotypic change.

Antigenic shift is contrasted with antigenic drift, which is the natural mutation over time of known strains of influenza (or other things, in a more general sense) which may lead to a loss of immunity, or in vaccine mismatch. Antigenic drift occurs in all types of influenza including influenza A, influenza B and influenza C. Antigenic shift, however, occurs only in influenza A because it infects more than just humans. Affected species include other mammals and birds, giving influenza A the opportunity for a major reorganization of surface antigens. Influenza B and C principally infect humans, minimizing the chance that a reassortment will change its phenotype drastically.

In the 1940s, Maurice Hilleman discovered antigenic shift, which is important for the emergence of new viral pathogens as it is a pathway that viruses may follow to enter a new niche.

== Role in the transmission of influenza viruses from non-human animals to people ==
Influenza A viruses are found in many different animals, including ducks, chickens, pigs, humans, whales, horses, and seals. Influenza B viruses circulate widely principally among humans, though it has recently been found in seals. Flu strains are named after their types of hemagglutinin and neuraminidase surface proteins (of which there are 18 and 9 respectively), so they will be called, for example, H3N2 for type-3 hemagglutinin and type-2 neuraminidase. Some strains of avian influenza (from which all other strains of influenza A are believed to stem) can infect pigs or other mammalian hosts. When two different strains of influenza infect the same cell simultaneously, their protein capsids and lipid envelopes are removed, exposing their RNA, which is then transcribed to mRNA. The host cell then forms new viruses that combine their antigens; for example, H3N2 and H5N1 can form H5N2 this way. Because the human immune system has difficulty recognizing the new influenza strain, it may be highly dangerous, and result in a new pandemic.

Influenza viruses which have undergone antigenic shift have caused the Asian Flu pandemic of 1957, the Hong Kong Flu pandemic of 1968, and the Swine Flu scare of 1976. Until recently, such combinations were believed to have caused the infamous Spanish flu outbreak of 1918 which killed 40~100 million people worldwide. However, more recent research suggests the 1918 pandemic was caused by the antigenic drift of a fully avian virus to a form that could infect humans efficiently. The most recent 2009 H1N1 outbreak was a result of antigenic shift and reassortment between human, avian, and swine viruses.

== Role of pigs in Influenza antigenic shift ==
Pigs are especially important in antigenic shift of influenza viruses. Because pigs can be infected with strains of influenza that infect various other species of animals, they act as 'mixing pots' for the virus. When multiple virus strains, such as a duck and human influenza strain, infect the same pig, antigenic shift is likely to occur. While most of the virus strains resulting from this will be dead-end strains, a few have the potential to become pandemic viruses.

== See also ==
- Coinfection
- Antigenic variation
