= Reassortment =

Type of nonhereditary genetic change involving swapping of DNA or RNA

Performing reassortment with flu viruses to make a vaccine

Reassortment is the mixing of the genetic material of a species into new combinations in different individuals. The product of reassortment is called a reassortant. It is particularly used when two similar viruses that are infecting the same cell exchange genetic material. More specifically, it refers to the swapping of entire segments of the genome, which only occurs between viruses with segmented genomes. (All known viruses with segmented genomes are RNA viruses. When only part of a nucleic acid molecule is changed by swapping, the process is instead known as recombination.)

== Flu virus ==
The classical example of reassortment is seen in the influenza viruses, whose genomes consist of eight distinct segments of RNA. These segments act like mini-chromosomes, and each time a flu virus is assembled, it requires one copy of each segment.

If a single host (a human, a chicken, or other animal) is infected by two different strains of the influenza virus, then it is possible that new assembled viral particles will be created from segments whose origin is mixed, some coming from one strain and some coming from another. The new reassortant strain will share properties of both of its parental lineages.

Reassortment is responsible for some of the major antigenic shifts in the history of the influenza virus. In the 1957 "Asian flu" and 1968 "Hong Kong flu" pandemics, flu strains were caused by reassortment between an avian virus and a human virus. In addition, the H1N1 virus responsible for 2009 swine flu pandemic resulted from a triple reassortment of bird, swine, and human flu viruses which further combined with an Eurasian pig flu virus, leading to the term "swine flu".

=== Multiplicity reactivation ===
When influenza viruses are inactivated by UV irradiation or ionizing radiation, they remain capable of multiplicity reactivation in infected host cells. If any of a virus's genome segments is damaged in such a way as to prevent replication or expression of an essential gene, the virus is inviable when it, alone, infects a host cell (single infection). However, when two or more damaged viruses infect the same cell (multiple infection), the infection can often succeed (multiplicity reactivation) due to reassortment of segments, provided that each of the eight genome segments is present in at least one undamaged copy.

=== Vaccine production ===
The inactivated influenza vaccine has been produced by harvesting viruses cultured in chicken eggs since the 1950s. A version of the virus that grows well in the egg would enable more efficient production. Today it is common to use reassortant strains with the antigens from a desired human flu virus and the rest of the genes from a pre-adapted virus. The live attenuated influenza vaccine is produced in a similar way, using a virus adapted for cold temperature (about 25 °C (77 °F)) growth and unable to efficiently replicate at human body temperature. It is grown in chicken eggs and chick kidney cells.

== Other viruses ==
The reptarenavirus family, responsible for inclusion body disease in snakes, shows a very high degree of genetic diversity due to reassortment of genetic material from multiple strains in the same infected animal.

== See also ==
- Other kinds of nonhereditary genetic change
  - Antigenic shift
  - Horizontal gene transfer
