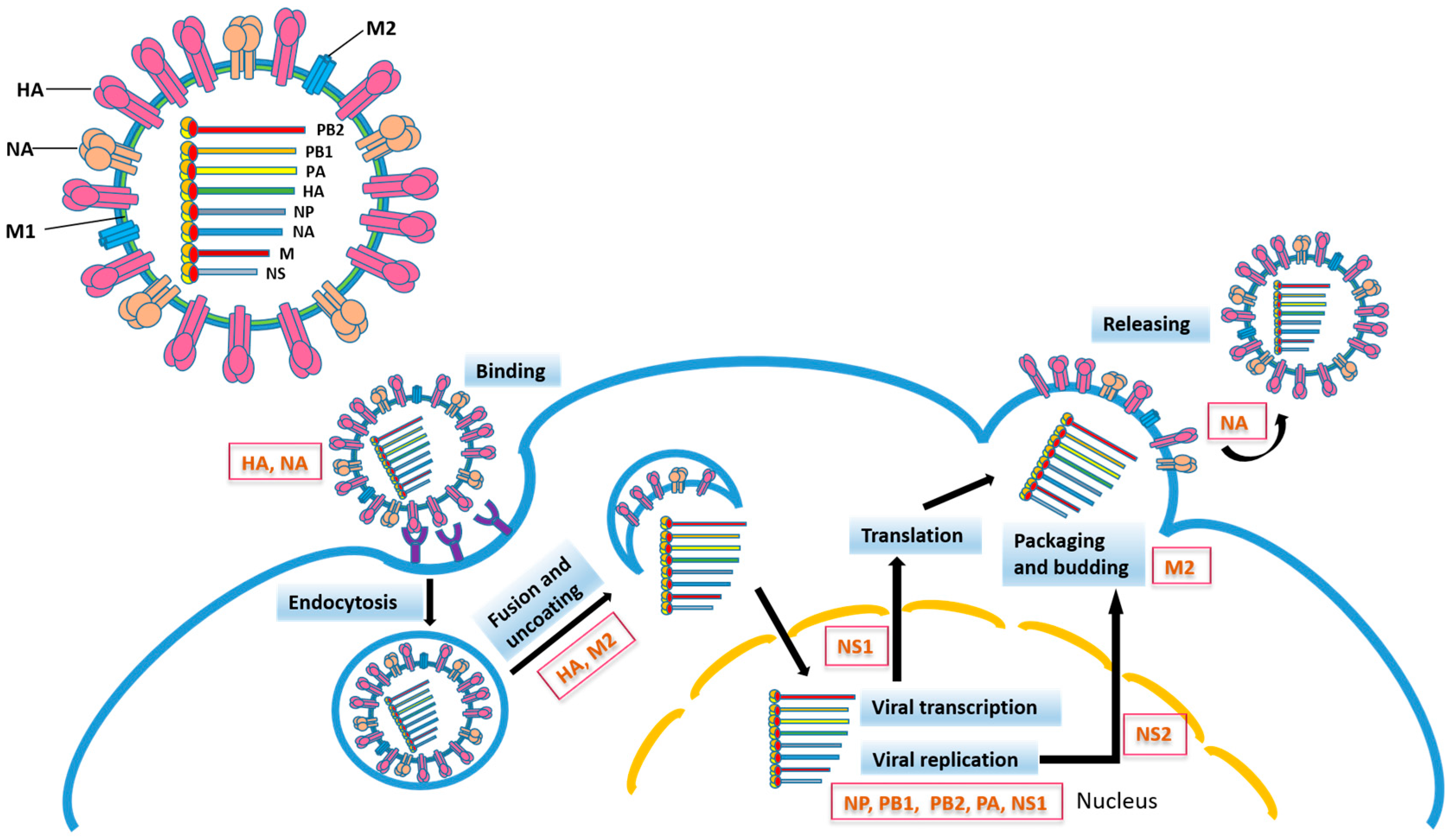
- Influenza virus particle and life cycle

Virus classification
- (unranked): Virus
- Realm: Riboviria
- Kingdom: Orthornavirae
- Phylum: Negarnaviricota
- Class: Insthoviricetes
- Order: Articulavirales

Families
- Amnoonviridae; Orthomyxoviridae

= Articulavirales =

Order of viruses

Articulavirales is an order of segmented negative-strand RNA viruses which infect invertebrates and vertebrates. It includes the family of influenza viruses which infect humans. It is the only order of viruses in the monotypic class Insthoviricetes. The order contains two families and eight genera. Metatranscriptomics of aquatic animal samples paired with phylogenetics suggests that Articulavirales exhibits complex cross-species virus transmission and virus-host co-divergence over deep evolutionary time scales. Potentially originating in ancient aquatic animals at least 600 Mya.

== Etymology ==
The order name Articulavirales derives from Latin articulata meaning "segmented" (alluding to the segmented genome of member viruses) added to the suffix for virus orders -virales. The class name Insthoviricetes is a portmanteau of member viruses "influenza, isavirus, and thogotovirus" added to the suffix -viricetes for virus classes.

== Genome ==
Member viruses have segmented, negative-sense, single-stranded RNA genomes.

== Classification ==
The order Articulavirales contains the following two families and 10 genera:

- Amnoonviridae
  - Tilapinevirus
- Orthomyxoviridae
  - Alphainfluenzavirus
  - Betainfluenzavirus
  - Deltainfluenzavirus
  - Gammainfluenzavirus
  - Isavirus
  - Mykissvirus
  - Quaranjavirus
  - Sardinovirus
  - Thogotovirus
