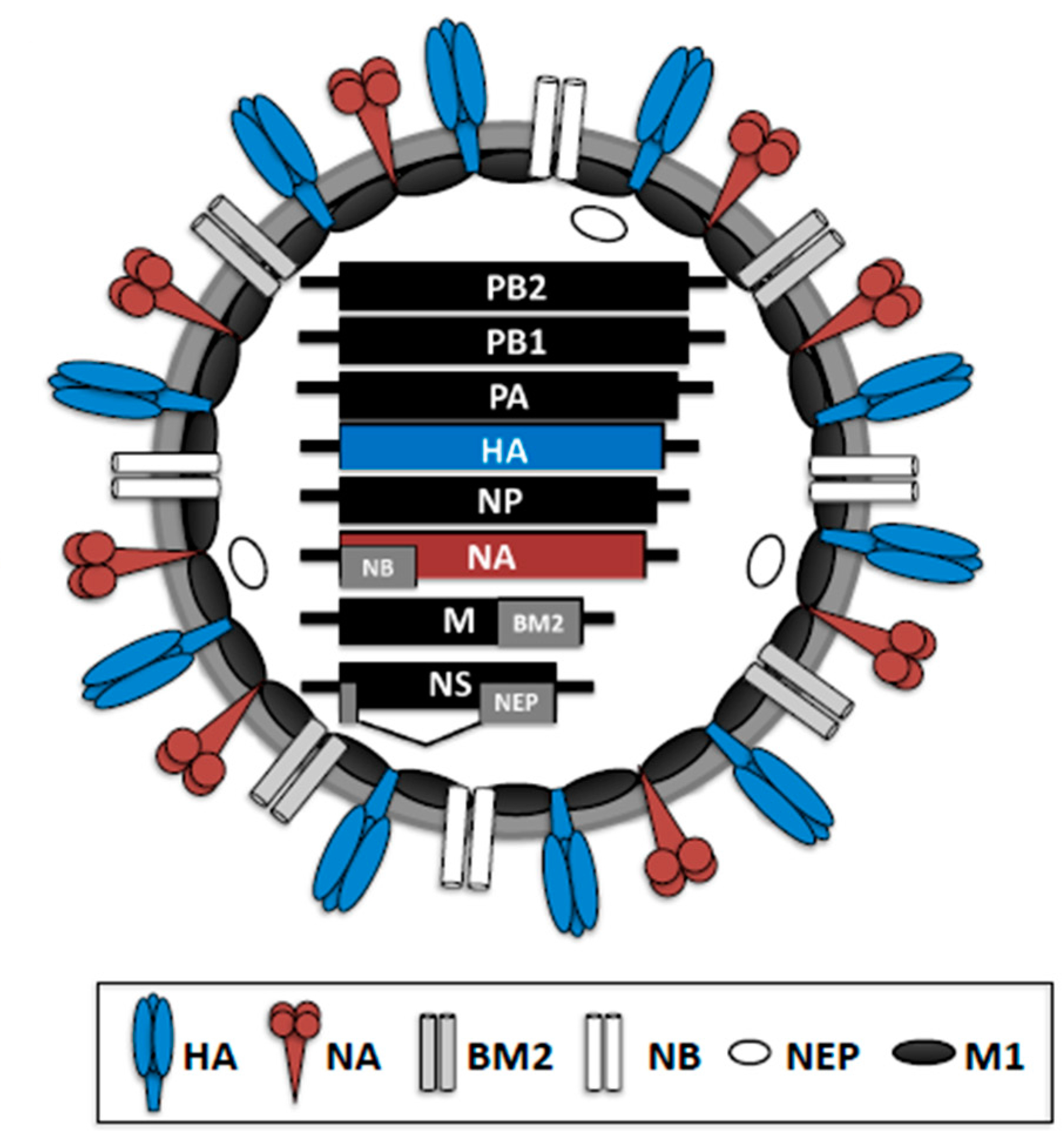
- Virion structure of influenza B virus

Virus classification
- (unranked): Virus
- Realm: Riboviria
- Kingdom: Orthornavirae
- Phylum: Negarnaviricota
- Class: Insthoviricetes
- Order: Articulavirales
- Family: Orthomyxoviridae
- Genus: Betainfluenzavirus
- Species: Betainfluenzavirus influenzae

Synonyms
- Species: Influenza type B virus; Influenza virus B; Genus: Influenzavirus B

= Influenza B virus =

Species of virus

Influenza B virus is the only species in the genus Betainfluenzavirus in the virus family Orthomyxoviridae.

Influenza B virus is a negative-sense single-strand RNA virus known only to infect certain mammal species, including humans, ferrets, pigs, and seals. This limited host range is apparently responsible for the lack of influenza pandemics associated with influenza B virus, in contrast with those caused by the morphologically similar influenza A virus, as both mutate by both antigenic drift and reassortment. Nevertheless, it is accepted that influenza B virus could cause significant morbidity and mortality worldwide, and significantly impacts adolescents and schoolchildren.

Until 2020, two distinct lineages of influenza B virus co-circulated in humans. Known as B/Yamagata and B/Victoria, these lineages are distinguished by differences in the antigenic structure of the surface glycoprotein hemagglutinin (HA) and their varying abilities to elicit innate immune responses in the host.

However, the B/Yamagata lineage may have become extinct in 2020/2021 due to COVID-19 pandemic measures. In October 2023, the World Health Organization concluded that protection against the Yamagata lineage was no longer necessary in the seasonal flu vaccine, reducing the number of lineages targeted by the vaccine from four to three. For the 2024–2025 Northern Hemisphere influenza season, the US Food and Drug Administration (FDA) recommends removing B/Yamagata from all influenza vaccines. The European Medicines Agency (EMA) recommends removing B/Yamagata from influenza vaccines for the 2024–2025 seasonal flu vaccine composition.

== Morphology ==
The influenza B virus capsid is enveloped while its virion consists of an envelope, a matrix protein, a nucleoprotein complex, a nucleocapsid, and a polymerase complex. It is sometimes spherical and sometimes filamentous. Its 500 or so surface projections are made of hemagglutinin and neuraminidase.

== Genome structure and genetics ==
The influenza B virus genome is 14,548 nucleotides long and consists of eight segments of linear negative-sense, single-stranded RNA. The multipartite genome is encapsidated, each segment in a separate nucleocapsid, and the nucleocapsids are surrounded by one envelope.

The ancestor of influenza viruses A and B and the ancestor of influenza virus C are estimated to have diverged from a common ancestor around 8,000 years ago. Influenza viruses A and B are estimated to have diverged from a single ancestor around 4,000 years ago, while the subtypes of influenza A virus are estimated to have diverged 2,000 years ago. Metatranscriptomics studies have also identified closely related "influenza B-like" viruses such as the Wuhan spiny eel influenza virus and also "influenza B-like" viruses in a number of vertebrate species such as salamanders and fish.

Diminishing the impact of this virus is the fact that, "in humans, influenza B viruses evolve slower than A viruses and faster than C viruses". Influenza B virus mutates at a rate 2 to 3 times slower than type A.

== Vaccine ==
In 1936, Thomas Francis Jr. discovered the ferret influenza B virus. Also in 1936, Macfarlane Burnet made the discovery that influenza virus may be cultured in hen embryonated eggs. This prompted research into the properties of the virus and the creation and application of inactivated vaccines in the late 1930s and early 1940s. Inactivated vaccines' usefulness as a preventative measure was proven in the 1950s. Later, 2003 saw the approval of the first live, attenuated influenza vaccine. Looking into influenza B specifically, Thomas Francis Jr. isolated influenza B virus in 1936. However, it was not until 1940 that influenza B viruses were discovered.

In 1942, a new bivalent vaccine was developed that protected against both the H1N1 strain of influenza A and the newly discovered influenza B virus. The viruses included in flu vaccines are changed each year.

Even though there have been two different lineages of influenza B viruses that were circulating during most seasons, flu vaccinations were long meant to protect against three different flu viruses: the influenza A(H1N1), influenza A(H3N2), and one type of influenza B virus. The second lineage of the B virus was since added to provide greater defense against circulating flu viruses. Two influenza A viruses and two influenza B viruses have up until 2023 been among the four flu viruses that a quadrivalent vaccine was intended to protect against. As of 2022 all flu vaccines in the United States were quadrivalent. The four main types of type A and B influenza viruses that are most likely to spread and make people sick during the upcoming flu season have been the targets of seasonal influenza (flu) vaccines. All of the available flu vaccinations in the United States have offered protection against the influenza A(H1), A(H3), B/Yamagata, and B/Victoria lineage viruses. Each of these four vaccine virus components has been chosen based on which flu viruses are infecting people ahead of the upcoming flu season, how widely they are spreading, how well the vaccines from the previous flu season may protect against those flu viruses, and the vaccine viruses' capacity to offer cross-protection.

For the 2022–2023 flu season, there were three flu vaccines that were preferentially recommended for people 65 years and older; various influenza (flu) vaccinations are authorized for use in people of various age groups.

However, the B/Yamagata lineage might have become extinct in 2020 due to COVID-19 pandemic measures, and there have been no naturally occurring cases confirmed since March 2020. In October 2023, the World Health Organization concluded that protection against the Yamagata lineage was no longer necessary in the seasonal flu vaccine, reducing the number of lineages targeted by the vaccine from four to three. If the virus has indeed gone extinct, it would be the first documented case of a virus going extinct due to changes in human behavior. However, the overall burden of the influenza virus would be similar to past seasons because there are still three remaining strains widely circulating.

== Discovery and development ==
In 1940, an acute respiratory illness outbreak in Northern America led to the discovery of influenza B virus (IBV), which was later discovered to not have any antigenic cross-reactivity with influenza A virus (IAV). Based on calculations of the rate of amino acid substitutions in HA proteins, it was estimated that IBV and IAV diverged from one another around 4000 years ago. However, the mechanisms of replication and transcription, as well as the functionality of the majority of viral proteins, appear to be largely conserved, with some unusual differences. Although IBV has occasionally been found in seals and pigs, its primary host species is the human. IBVs can also spread epidemics throughout the world, but they receive less attention than IAVs do due to their less prevalent nature, both in infecting hosts and in the symptoms that result from infection. IBVs used to be unclassified, but since the 1980s, they have been divided into the B/Yamagata and B/Victoria lineages. IBVs have further divisions known as clades and sub-clades, just like IAVs do.

Hemagglutinin (HA) and neuraminidase (NA) are two virus surface antigens that are constantly changing. Antigenic drift or antigenic shift are two possible influenza viral changes. Small changes in the HA and NA of influenza viruses caused by antigenic drift result in the creation of novel strains that the immune system of humans might not be able to identify. These emerging strains are the influenza virus's evolutionary responses to a potent immunological response across the population. The main cause of influenza recurrence is antigenic drift, which makes it essential to reevaluate and update the influenza vaccine's ingredient list every year. Annual influenza outbreaks are caused by antigenic drift and declining immunity, when the residual defenses from prior exposures to related viruses are incomplete. Antigenic drift occurs in influenza A, B, and C.

Hemagglutination inhibition experiments using ferret serum after infection allowed the identification of two very different antigenic influenza type B variants in the years 1988–1989. These viruses shared antigens with either B/Yamagata/16/88, a variation that was discovered in Japan in May 1988, or B/Victoria/2/87. The B/Victoria/2/87 virus shared antigens with all influenza B viruses discovered in the United States during an outbreak in the winter of 1988–1989.

In Japan, influenza B virus reinfection was investigated virologically in 1985–1991 and epidemiologically in 1979–1991 in children. Four influenza B virus outbreaks that each included antigenic drift occurred during the course of this study. Between the epidemics in 1987–1988 and 1989–1990, there was a significant genetic and antigenic change in the viruses. Depending on the influenza seasons, the minimum rate of reinfection with influenza B virus for the entire period was between 2 and 25%. Hemagglutination inhibition assays were used to examine the antigens of the influenza B virus primary and reinfection strains that were isolated from 18 children between the years of 1985 and 1990, which encompassed three epidemic periods. The findings revealed that reinfection occurred with the viruses recovered during the 1984–1985 and 1987–1988 influenza seasons, which belonged to the same lineage and were antigenically close.

The B/Yamagata lineage might have been eradicated as a result of COVID-19 pandemic measures, and there have been no naturally occurring cases confirmed since March 2020. Although this development has resulted in updated recommendations regarding vaccine composition, continued surveillance is required to assess this conclusion, as pauses in influenza B virus circulation have been observed before.
