= Wet markets in Hong Kong =

Markets selling perishable goods in Hong Kong

Street market
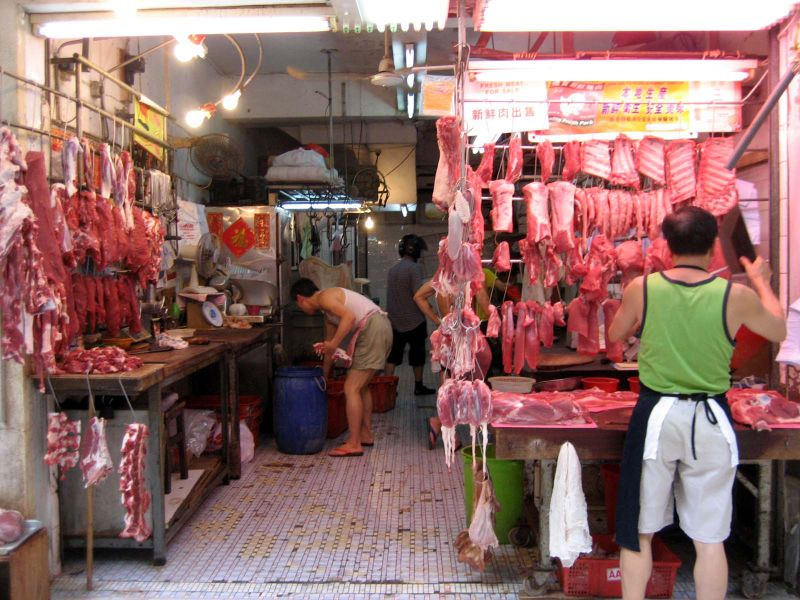
- A meat stall at a market in Hong Kong
- Traditional Chinese: 傳統市場
- Simplified Chinese: 传统市场
- Hanyu Pinyin: chuántǒng shìchǎng
- Jyutping: cyun^{4} tung^{2} si^{5} coeng^{4}
- Literal meaning: traditional market
Transcriptions
Standard Mandarin
- Hanyu Pinyin: chuántǒng shìchǎng
Yue: Cantonese
- Jyutping: cyun^{4} tung^{2} si^{5} coeng^{4}

Alternative Chinese name
- Traditional Chinese: 街市
- Simplified Chinese: 街市
- Jyutping: gaai^{1} si^{5}
- Literal meaning: street market
Transcriptions
Yue: Cantonese
- Jyutping: gaai^{1} si^{5}
- IPA: [kaj˥.si˩˧]

In Hong Kong, public markets, called 街市 ("street market") in Cantonese and referred to in English as wet markets, are traditional markets that sell fresh meat, produce, and other perishable goods. Most neighbourhoods of Hong Kong have one, and they often cater to older residents, low-income residents, and domestic workers. They are regulated by the Food and Environmental Hygiene Department (FEHD).

== Terminology ==
The Cantonese name for these markets is 街市, meaning "street market". The English term "wet market" did not originate in mainland China and was popularised by the Singaporean government in the 1970s. In Hong Kong, the "wet" refers to the markets' fresh produce, known in Cantonese as 濕貨 ("wet goods"), and to the water used to keep seafood alive, keep vegetables clean and wash chopping boards; in this sense, "wet" is essentially a synonym for "fresh". Critics have argued that in pandemic-era Western coverage the word instead evoked unhygienic conditions.

== Early history ==
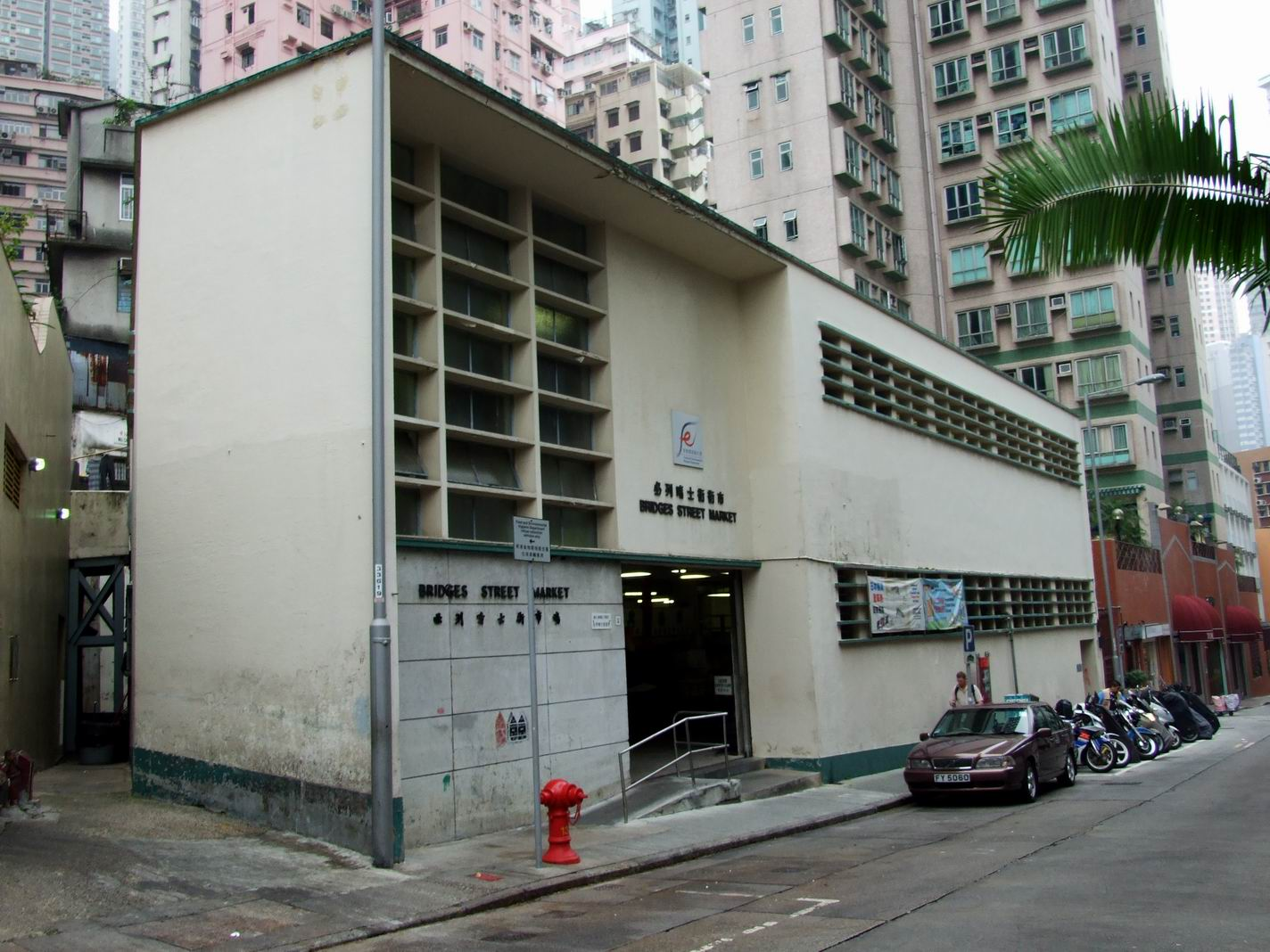
The building that housed the former Bridges Street Market in Hong Kong

On 16 May 1842, Central Market was opened in a central position on Queen's Road in Hong Kong. In this market, people could find all kinds of meat, fruit and vegetables, poultry, salt fish, fresh fish, weighing rooms and money changers.

In 1920, the Reclamation Street Market was opened in Hong Kong. Due to structural problems, Reclamation Street Market was removed by the government in 1953. In 1957, Yau Ma Tei Street Market launched to replace the Reclamation Street Market. There were fixed-pitch stalls which sold vegetables, fruits, seafood, beef, pork, and poultry. Also, there were stalls selling baby chickens, baby ducks, and three-striped box turtles as pets.

== Popularity ==
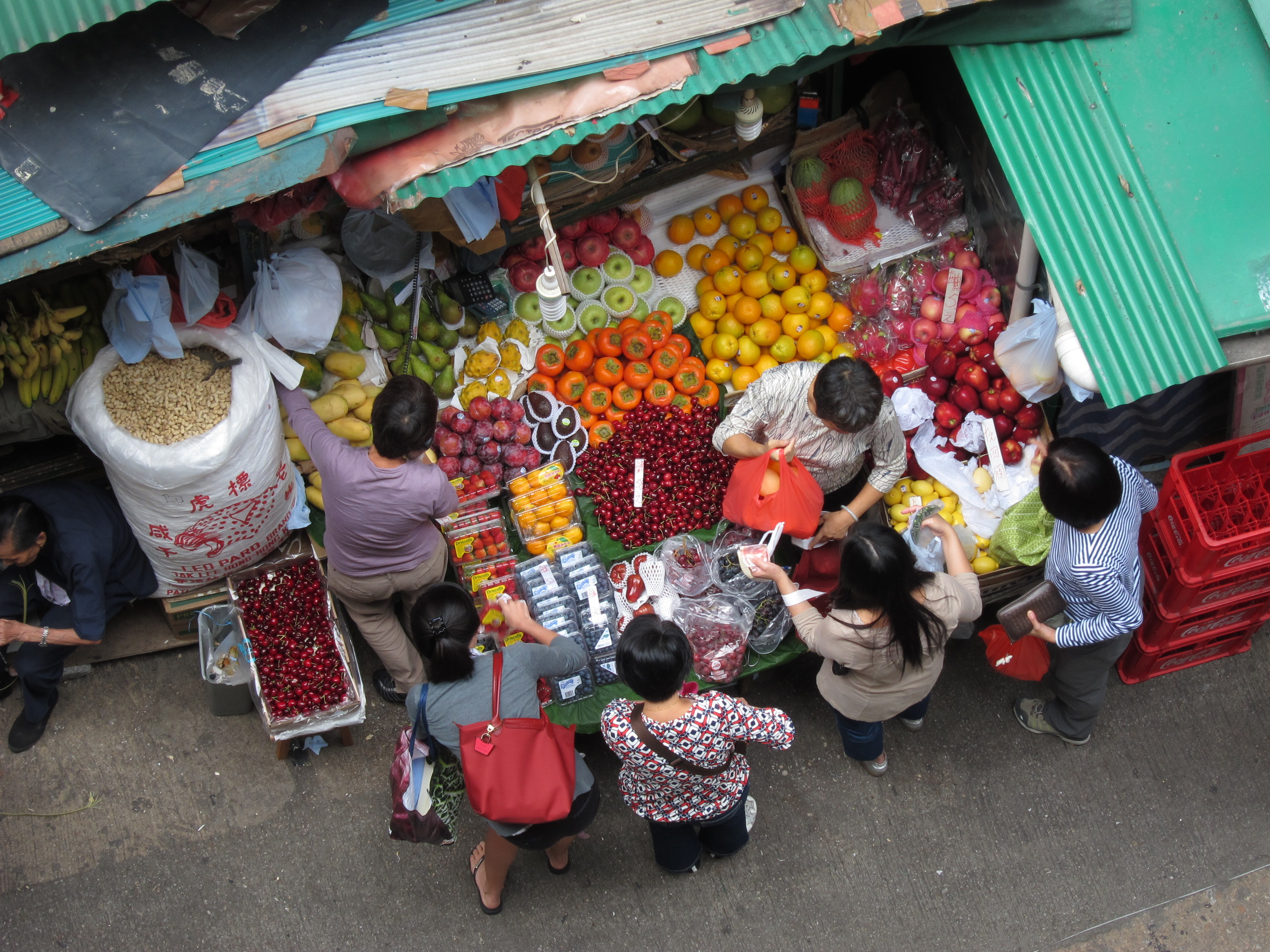
A fruit stall at a traditional open-air street market in Mid-Levels

In 1994, these markets accounted for 70% of produce sales and 50% of meat sales in Hong Kong.

They are most frequented by older residents, those with lower incomes, and domestic helpers who serve approximately 10 percent of Hong Kong's residents. Most neighbourhoods contain at least one. The markets have also become destinations for tourists to "see the real Hong Kong".

== Ownership ==
In 2018, the FEHD operated 74 markets housing approximately 13,070 stalls. In addition, the Hong Kong Housing Authority operated 21 markets while private developers operated about 99 (in 2017). As of 2018, planning is underway for new markets in the new towns at Tung Chung, Tin Shui Wai, Hung Shui Kiu, Tseung Kwan O, and Kwu Tung North. Since many of the market buildings are owned by private property investment firms, the prices of food can vary from market to market.

== Practices ==
Stalls in Hong Kong's markets are known to use red lampshades to make the food look fresher.

Inhumane slaughter methods are often used, including air asphyxiation of large numbers of live fish. According to a Dutch study, it takes 55-250 minutes for various species of fish to become insensible during this process.

== Regulations ==
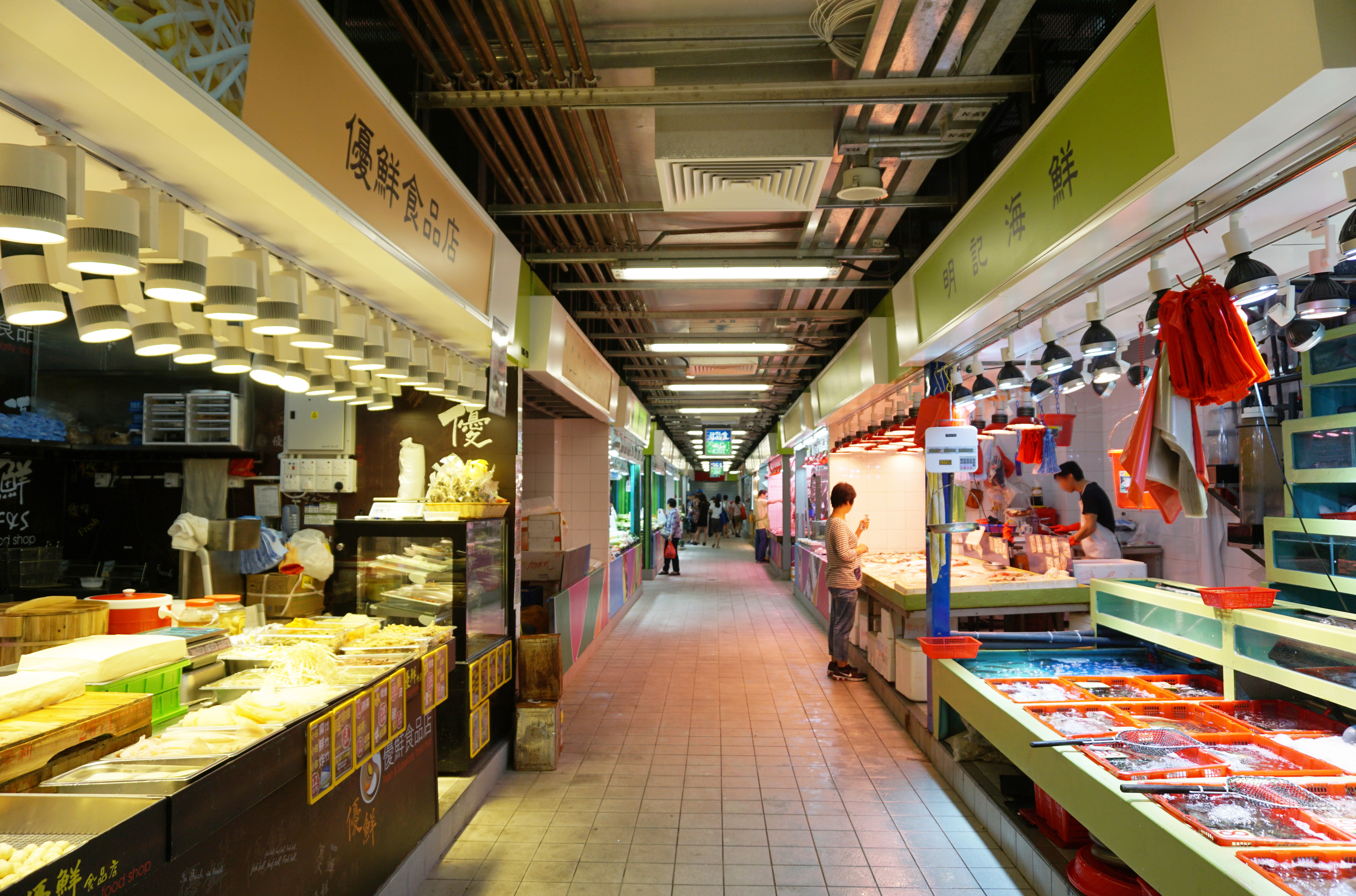
Shui Chuen O Market, a newer market under the ownership of the Hong Kong Housing Authority

Prior to 2000, many of Hong Kong's public markets were managed by the Urban Council (within Hong Kong Island and Kowloon) or the Regional Council (in the New Territories). Since the disbandment of the two councils on 31 December 1999, these markets have been managed by the Food and Environmental Hygiene Department (FEHD) of the Hong Kong government.

Markets in Hong Kong are governed by the law of Hong Kong. Under the Slaughterhouse Regulation, the slaughtering of live bovine animals, swine, goats, sheep or soliped for human consumption must take place in a licensed slaughterhouse, None of the markets in Hong Kong hold wild or exotic animals.

=== Poultry ===
The retail sale of live poultry in Hong Kong is permitted at licensed outlets only. At the end of 2016, there were 85 retail shops within public markets licensed to sell live poultry.

In 2008, the government of Hong Kong proposed that all poultry should be slaughtered at central abattoirs to combat the spread of avian flu. The FEHD has implemented a number of measures to reduce the risk of avian influenza. Regular inspections and cleaning take place, including nightly disinfection of each stall by external contractors. Stall owners selling live poultry are not allowed to keep the animals on the premises overnight; they must be slaughtered before 8:00 pm nightly.

== See also ==
- Wet markets in China
