= Influenza A virus subtype H7N9 =

Virus classification
- (unranked): Virus
- Realm: Riboviria
- Kingdom: Orthornavirae
- Phylum: Negarnaviricota
- Class: Insthoviricetes
- Order: Articulavirales
- Family: Orthomyxoviridae
- Genus: Alphainfluenzavirus
- Species: Influenza A virus
- Serotype: Influenza A virus subtype H7N9

Subtype of the influenza A virus

Influenza A virus subtype H7N9 (A/H7N9) is a subtype of the influenza A virus, which causes influenza (flu), predominantly in birds. It is enzootic (maintained in the population) in many bird populations. The virus can spread rapidly through poultry flocks and among wild birds; it can also infect humans that have been exposed to infected birds.

A/H7N9 virus is shed in the saliva, mucus, and feces of infected birds; other infected animals may shed bird flu viruses in respiratory secretions and other body fluids.

Symptoms of A/H7N9 influenza vary according to both the strain of virus underlying the infection and on the species of bird or mammal affected. Classification as either Low Pathogenic Avian Influenza (LPAI) or High Pathogenic Avian Influenza (HPAI) is based on the severity of symptoms in domestic chickens and does not predict the severity of symptoms in humans. Chickens infected with LPAI A/H7N9 virus display mild symptoms or are asymptomatic, whereas HPAI A/H7N9 causes serious breathing difficulties, a significant drop in egg production, and sudden death.

In mammals, including humans, A/H7N9 influenza (whether LPAI or HPAI) is rare; it can usually be traced to close contact with infected poultry or contaminated material such as feces. Symptoms of infection vary from mild to severe, including fever, diarrhoea, and cough; the disease can often be fatal.

The A/H7N9 virus is considered to be enzootic (continually present) in wild aquatic birds, which may carry the virus over large distances during their migration. The first known case of A/H7N9 influenza infecting humans was reported in March 2013, in China. Cases continued to be recorded in poultry and humans in China over the course of the next 5 years. Between February 2013 and February 2019 there were 1,568 confirmed human cases and 616 deaths associated with the outbreak in China. Initially the virus was low pathogenic to poultry, however around 2017 a highly pathogenic strain developed which became dominant. The outbreak in China has been partially contained by a program of poultry vaccination which commenced in 2017.

Bird-adapted A/H7N9 transmits relatively easily from poultry to humans, although human to human transmission is rare. Its ability to cross the species barrier renders it a potential pandemic threat, especially if it should acquire genetic material from a human-adapted strain.

== Virology ==
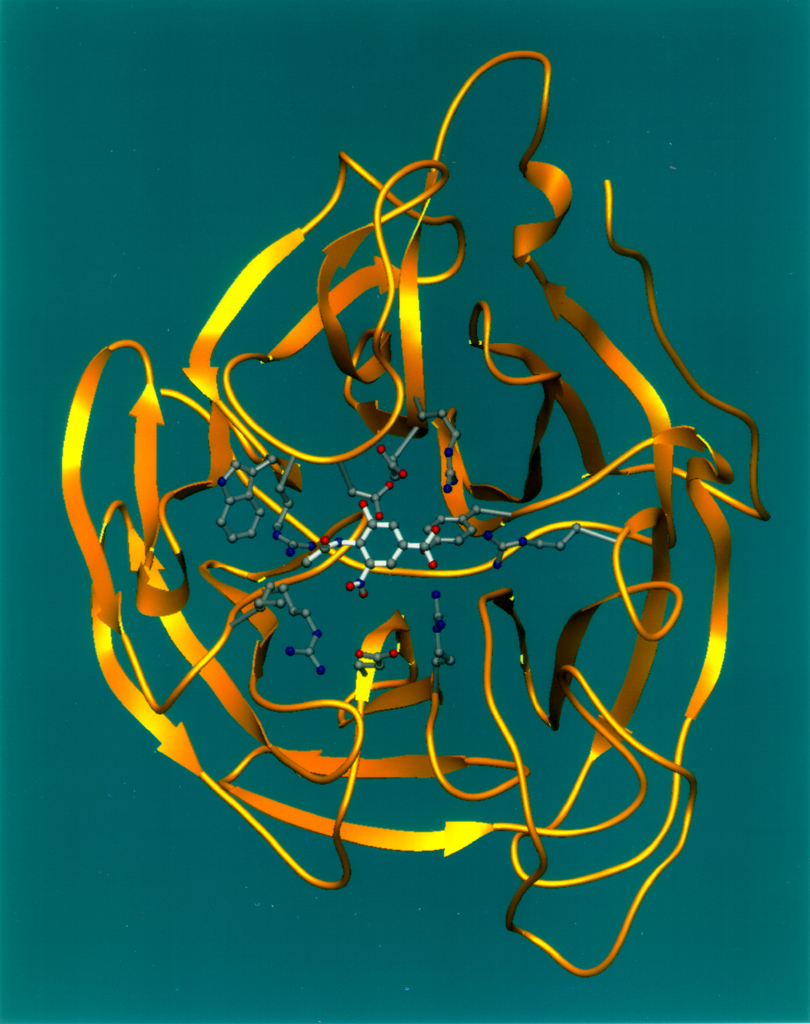
The N in H7N9 stands for "Neuraminidase", the protein depicted in this ribbon diagram.

H7N9 is a subtype of Influenza A virus. Like all subtypes it is an enveloped negative-sense RNA virus, with a segmented genome. Influenza viruses have a relatively high mutation rate that is characteristic of RNA viruses. The segmentation of its genome facilitates genetic recombination by reassortment in hosts infected with two different strains of influenza viruses at the same time. Through a combination of mutation and genetic reassortment the virus can evolve to acquire new characteristics, enabling it to evade host immunity and occasionally to jump from one species of host to another.

=== Highly pathogenic avian influenza ===
Because of the impact of avian influenza on economically important chicken farms, a classification system was devised in 1981 which divided avian virus strains as either highly pathogenic (and therefore potentially requiring vigorous control measures) or low pathogenic. The test for this is based solely on the effect on chickens – a virus strain is highly pathogenic avian influenza (HPAI) if 75% or more of chickens die after being deliberately infected with it. The alternative classification is low pathogenic avian influenza (LPAI). This classification system has since been modified to take into account the structure of the virus' haemagglutinin protein. Other species of birds, especially water birds, can become infected with HPAI virus without experiencing severe symptoms and can spread the infection over large distances; the exact symptoms depend on the species of bird and the strain of virus. Classification of an avian virus strain as HPAI or LPAI does not predict how serious the disease might be if it infects humans or other mammals.

Since 2006, the World Organization for Animal Health requires all LPAI H5 and H7 detections to be reported because of their potential to mutate into highly pathogenic strains.

== Epidemiology ==
Some species of wild aquatic birds act as natural asymptomatic carriers of a large variety of influenza A viruses, which they can spread over large distances in their annual migration. Symptoms of avian influenza vary according to both the strain of virus underlying the infection, and on the species of bird affected. Symptoms of influenza in birds may include swollen head, watery eyes, unresponsiveness, lack of coordination, respiratory distress such as sneezing or gurgling.

Humans and other mammals can only become infected with avian influenza, including A/H7N9, after prolonged close contact with infected birds or contaminated environments. In mammals including humans, infection with avian influenza (whether LPAI or HPAI) is rare. Symptoms of infection vary from mild to severe, including fever, diarrhoea, and cough.

As of February, 2024 there have been very few instances of human-to-human transmission, and each outbreak has been limited to a few people. All subtypes of avian Influenza A have potential to cross the species barrier into humans, with H5N1 and H7N9 considered the biggest threats.

== History ==
=== Outbreak in China, 2013-2019 ===
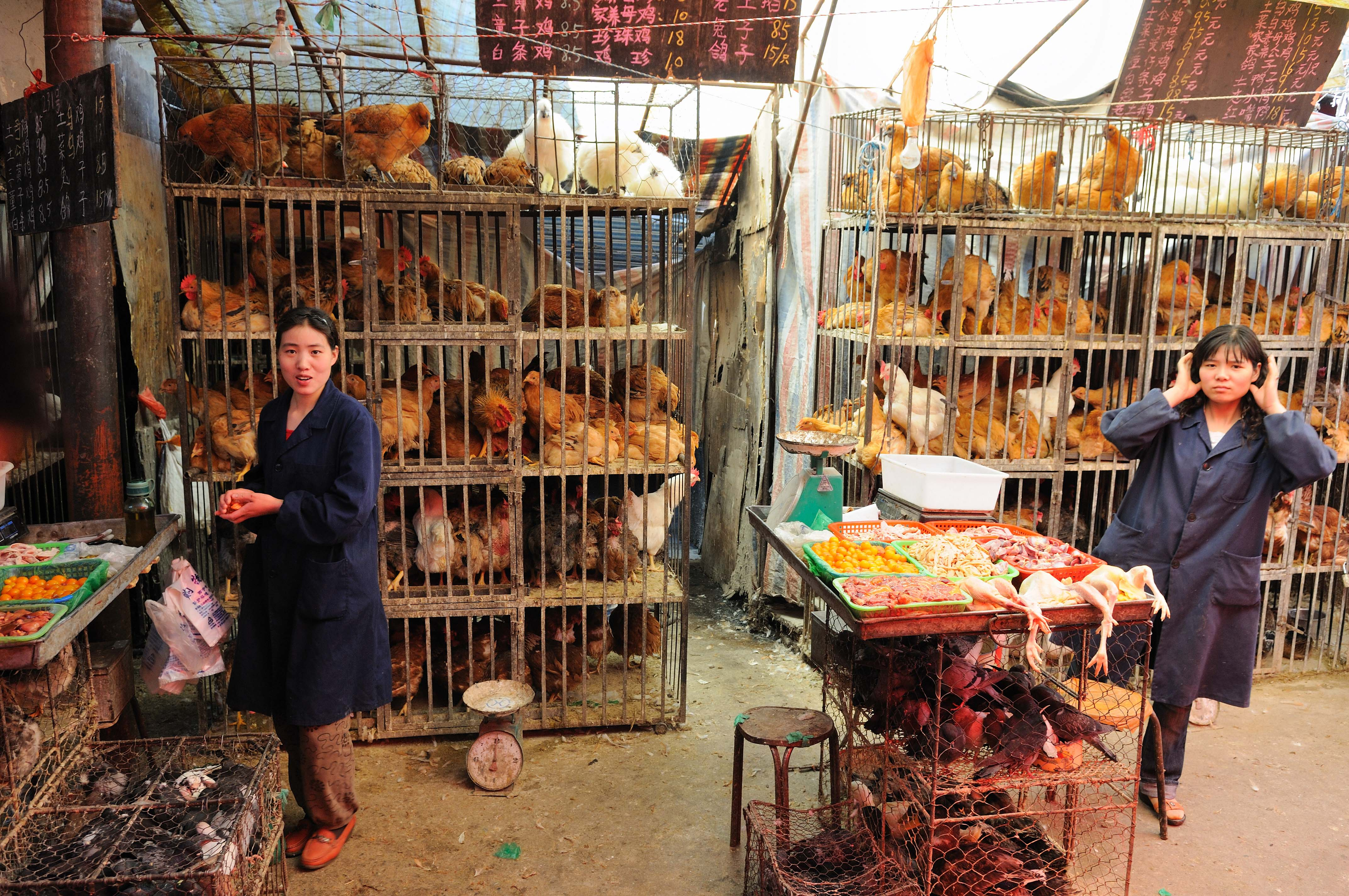
Live poultry market in Xining, China, 2008.

Prior to 2013, A/H7N9 had previously been isolated only in birds, with outbreaks reported in the Netherlands, Japan, and the United States. Until the 2013 outbreak in China, no human infections with A/H7N9 had been reported.

A significant outbreak of Influenza A virus subtype H7N9 (A/H7N9) started in March 2013 when severe influenza affected 18 humans in China; six subsequently died. It was discovered that a low pathogenic strain of A/H7N9 was circulating among chickens, and that all the affected people had been exposed in poultry markets. Further cases among humans and poultry in mainland China continued to be identified sporadically throughout the year, followed by a peak around the festival season of Chinese New Year (January and February) in early 2014 which was attributed to the seasonal surge in poultry production.

Infections among humans and poultry continued during the next few years, again with peaks around the new year. In 2016 a virus strain emerged which was highly pathogenic to chickens. In order to contain the HPAI outbreak, the Chinese authorities in 2017 initiated a large scale vaccination campaign against avian influenza in poultry. Since then, the number of outbreaks in poultry, as well as the number of human cases, dropped significantly. In humans, symptoms and mortality for both LPAI and HPAI strains have been similar. Although no human H7N9 infections have been reported since February 2019, the virus is still circulating in poultry, particularly in laying hens. It has demonstrated antigenic drift to evade vaccines, and remains a potential threat to the poultry industry and public health.

As of May 2022, a total of 1568 confirmed A(H7N9) human infections with 616 deaths have been reported, with a case fatality ratio (CFR) of 39%.

Genetic characterisation of the "Asian lineage" strain of avian influenza A/H7N9 shows that it was not related to A/H7N9 strains previously identified in Europe and North America. This new strain resulted from the recombination of genes between several parent viruses noted in poultry and wild birds in Asia. The H7 gene is most closely related to sequences found in samples from ducks in Zhejiang province in 2011.The N9 gene was closely related to isolated wild ducks in South Korea in 2011. Other genes resembled samples collected in Beijing and Shanghai in 2012. The genes would have been carried along the East Asian flyway by wild birds during their annual migration.

The genetic characteristics of Asian lineage A/H7N9 virus are of particular concern because of their pandemic potential. The virus is able to infect humans relatively easily, but does not sustain human-to-human transmission. If the virus were to acquire the ability to transmit easily between humans (either through mutation or genetic reassortment) there is potential for a severe epidemic or pandemic.

=== Other occurrences ===
During early 2017, outbreaks of avian influenza A(H7N9) occurred in poultry in the USA. The strain in these outbreaks was of North American origin and is unrelated to the Asian lineage H7N9 which is associated with human infections in China.

In May 2024, an HPAI A/H7N9 was detected on a poultry farm with 151,894 birds in Terang, Australia. There were 14,000 clinically affected birds. It is presumed that wild birds were the source of the outbreak.

An H7N9 outbreak in the US was confirmed on March 13, 2025, on a commercial broiler breeder chicken farm in Noxubee, Mississippi, housing 47,654 chickens. All 47,654 chickens were euthanized as a precautionary measure to prevent further spread of the virus.

== Vaccine ==
The continuing evolution and antigenic drift of the A/H7N9 virus makes further development difficult as any significant outbreak could involve a completely new strain. A number of human vaccines targeting A/H7N9 have been trialled in relatively small groups of subjects; in the event of any outbreak, a candidate vaccine virus would be distributed to manufacturers

== See also ==
- Antigenic shift
- Influenza A virus subtype H9N2
- Influenza A virus subtype H5N1
- Pandemic H1N1/09 virus
- Influenza research
- Zoonosis
