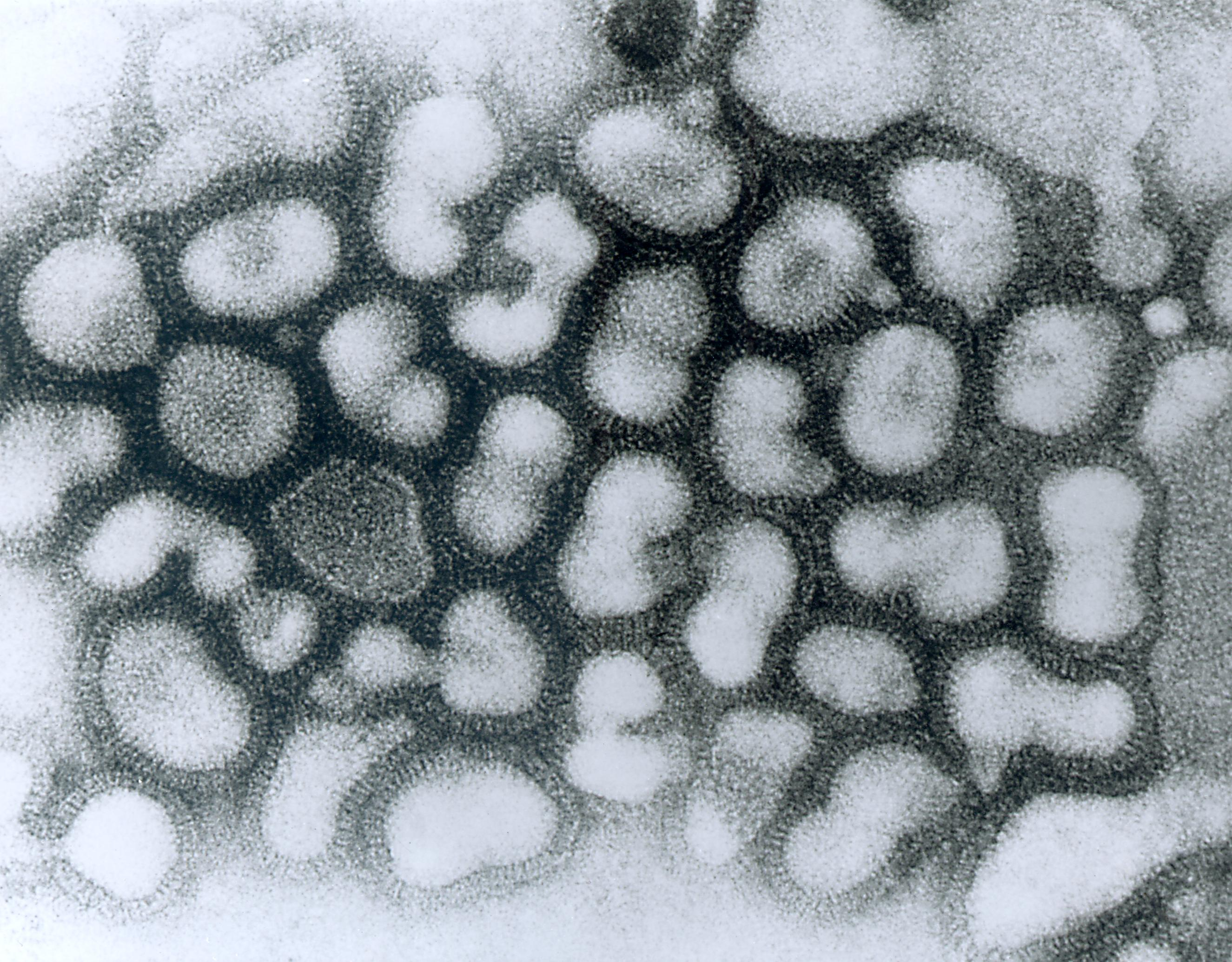
- Influenza A - late passage

Virus classification
- (unranked): Virus
- Realm: Riboviria
- Kingdom: Orthornavirae
- Phylum: Negarnaviricota
- Class: Insthoviricetes
- Order: Articulavirales
- Family: Orthomyxoviridae
- Genus: Alphainfluenzavirus
- Species: Influenza A virus
- Serotype: Influenza A virus subtype H9N2

= Influenza A virus subtype H9N2 =

Virus subtype

Influenza A virus subtype H9N2 (A/H9N2) is a subtype of the species Influenza A virus (bird flu virus). Since 1998 a total of 86 cases of human infection with H9N2 viruses have been reported.

== Infection in birds ==
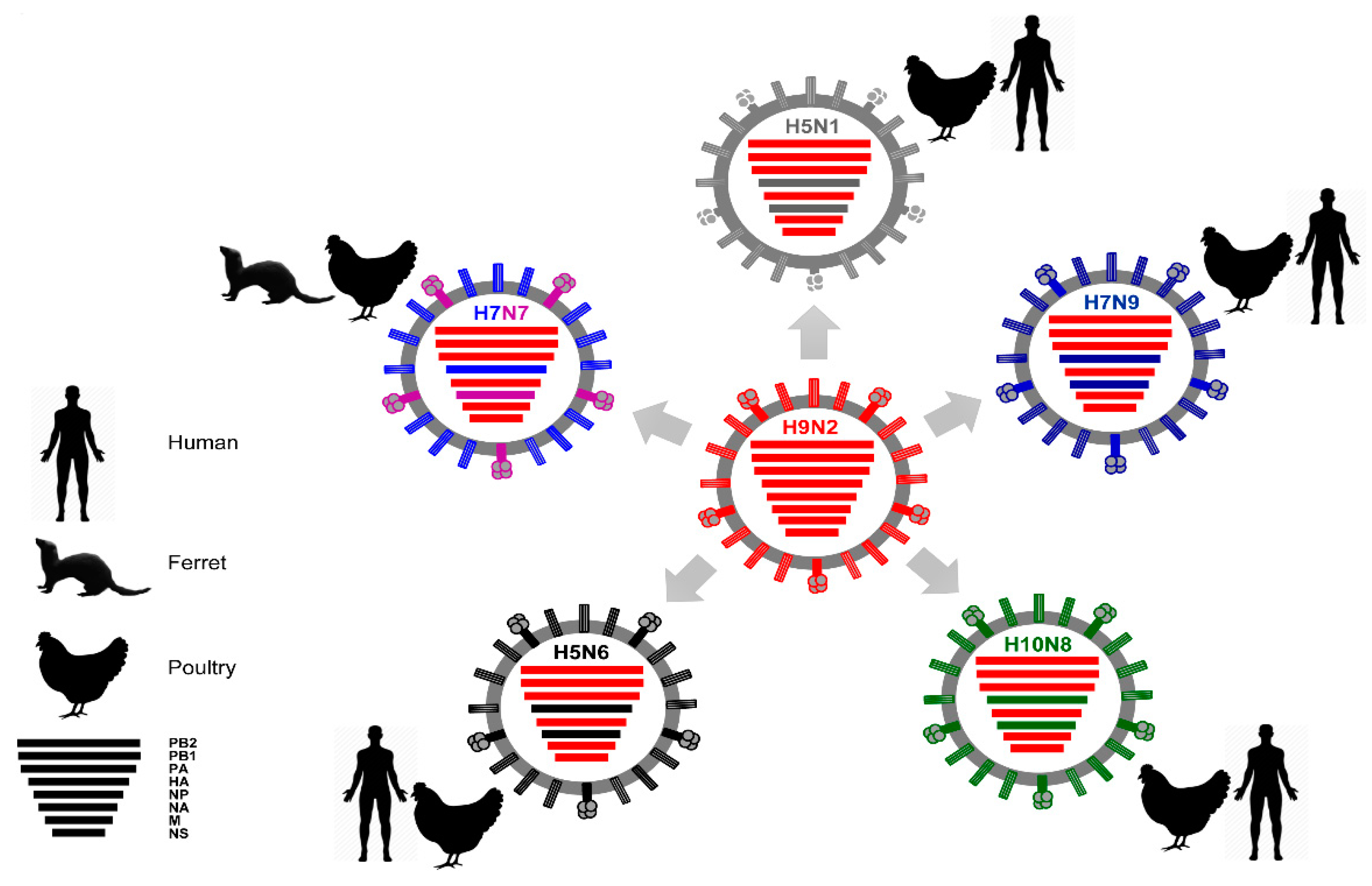
H9N2-type influenza A viruses donate their internal genes to other influenza A virus subtypes

H9N2 is the most common subtype of influenza viruses in Chinese chickens and thus causes great economic loss for the poultry industry, even under the long-term vaccination programs. Recent human infections with avian influenza virus revealed that H9N2 is the gene donor for H7N9 and H10N8 viruses that can infect humans too. The crucial role of H9N2 viruses due to the wide host range, adaptation to both poultry and mammals and extensive gene reassortment. In China, which is regarded as a breeding ground of avian influenza viruses, the H9N2 virus has been detected in multiple avian species, including chicken, duck, quail, pheasant, partridge, pigeon, silkie chicken, chukar and egret.

Epidemiological and genetic studies revealed that the hemagglutinin (HA) gene of the H9N2 influenza viruses could be divided into Eurasian avian and American avian lineages. The Eurasian avian lineage involved three distinct lineages, including A/chicken/Beijing/1/94-like (BJ/94-like), A/quail/Hong Kong/G1/97-like (G1-like), and A/duck/Hong Kong/Y439/97 (Y439-like).

== Transmission from chicken to human ==
The H9N2 influenza virus can be transmitted by air droplet, dust, feed, or water. Chickens usually seemed to be healthy after the infection but some of them do show depression and ruffled feathers. The virus replicates itself in the trachea. It makes chickens more susceptible to secondary infections, especially Escherichia coli infections with a mortality rate of at least 10%. Also, the trachea or bronchi are easily embolized by mucus when the ventilation is poor, leading to severe respiratory disease and death.

== Antigenicity ==
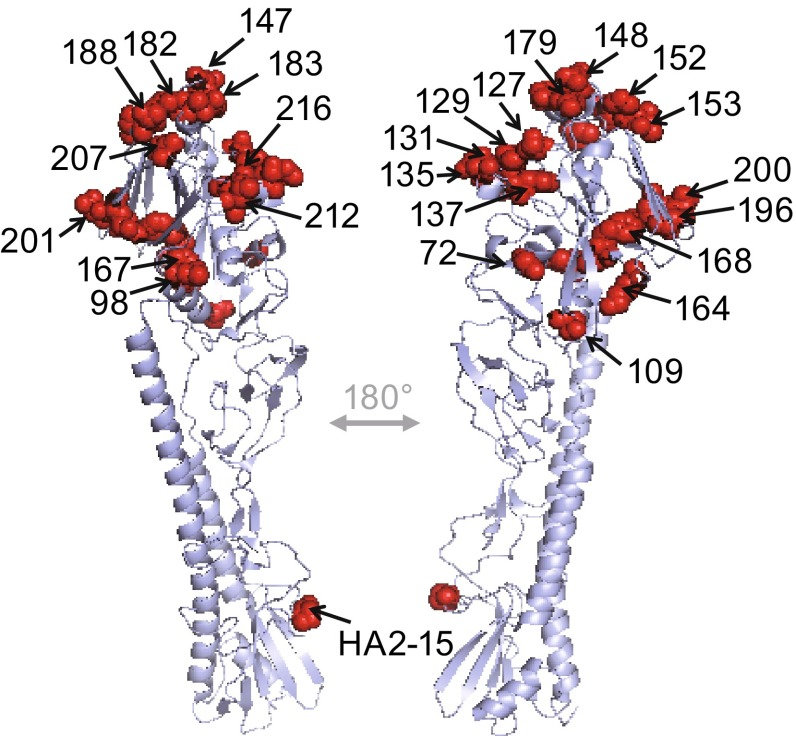
Localization of amino acids related to the antigenicity of H9N2 influenza virus on the three-dimensional map of A/Swine/Hong Kong/9/98. PDB ID is 1JSD. All positions are shown with H9 numbering

H9N2 viruses isolated from chickens in China showed antigenic drift that evolved into distinct antigenic groups. This antigenic drift may have led to immunization failure and may explain the current prevalence of the H9N2 influenza virus in China. The identification of amino acids in H9 antigenic sites revealed different distribution of antigenic areas among other subtypes. Multiple amino acid positions in HA protein related to the antigenicity of H9N2 viruses were identified, most of which located in the distal head of the HA trimer. H9N2 influenza virus has been recognized to reassort with multiple other subtypes, including H6N1, H6N2, and H5N1 viruses. Moreover, H7N9 influenza viruses continued to reassort with circulating H9N2 viruses, resulting in multiple genotypes of H7N9 viruses. The contribution of H9N2 genes, especially ribonucleoprotein (RNP) genes, to the infection in human needs to be determined.
