= National Association of State Public Health Veterinarians =

Logo for the Association

The National Association of State Public Health Veterinarians (NASPHV) develops and publishes uniform public health procedures involving zoonotic disease (diseases transmitted from animals to people) in the United States and its territories. These veterinarians work closely with emergency rooms, legislators, local officials, schools, health departments, and the general public to prevent disease exposure and control diseases that are transmitted to humans from animals and animal products.

== About the Association ==
The Association provides the following services:
-a communication network between and for its members,
-education and resources to the public health community and general public, and
-prevention and control guidance on zoonotic disease issues.

State Public Health Veterinarians hold at least one annual meeting, but the President of the Association can call more if necessary, and groups of veterinarians can also meet in quorums.

The Association was started in 1953 as the "Association of State and Territorial Public Health Veterinarians". This Association had the same basic objectives. It was during this time that the National Standard Rabies Vaccination Certificate was adopted, and it was a part of the ban on pet sales of baby turtles.

With declining support from the CDC and difficulty taking progressive action, the Association voted to become the National Association of State Public Health Veterinarians, and independent incorporated organization, in 1970. Trouble with rabies vaccine reports prompted the NASPHV to take the responsibility for the annual Rabies Compendium in 1975, and with support, it has created the standardized procedure found in the compendium today. In the 1980s, NASPHV began to publish Zoonotic Infection Practice Papers, which led to the Compendium of Measures to Prevent Disease and Injury Associated with Animals in Public Settings, first published in 2003.

The current membership in the Association is about 160 veterinarians.

== NASPHV Publications ==
The Association publishes four compendia:

- Compendium of Animal Rabies Prevention and Control
- Compendium of Measures To Control Chlamydophila psittaci Infection Among Humans (Psittacosis) and Pet Birds (Avian Chlamydiosis)
- Compendium of Measures to Prevent Disease Associated with Animals in Public Settings
- Compendium of Veterinary Standard Precautions for Zoonotic Disease Prevention in Veterinary Personnel

=== Compendium of Animal Rabies Prevention and Control ===
The purpose of this compendium is to standardize procedures concerning rabies prevention and control, in both domestic animals and wildlife. It provides recommendations which are meant to contribute to the national rabies control program.

The latest revision of this compendium was published May 31, 2011.

Recent changes to the compendium include:
-Addition of national case definition for animal rabies to provide clarification
-Expansion of Part I A.9. to clarify use of Centers for Disease Control and Prevention rabies laboratory, include testing methodology for appropriate field testing, and clarify ante mortem procedure
-Expansion of Part I A.11. to include topics warranting further study
-Update to table of rabies vaccines licensed and marketed in the U.S.

=== Compendium of Measures to Control Chlamydophila psittaci Infection Among Humans and Pet Birds ===
The purpose of this compendium is to provide information about Chlamydophila psittaci to all those concerned with the control of the disease, which had 66 reported human cases between 2005 and 2009. It includes standardized procedures to control avian chlamydiosis in birds, which causes the disease in humans.

The latest revision of this compendium was published in 2010.

=== Compendium of Measures to Prevent Disease Associated with Animals in Public Settings ===
The purpose of this compendium is to provide guidelines to reduce risk of spreading zoonotic disease when in contact with animals, since the number of disease outbreaks associated with this type of contact increased from 1991 to 2005.

The latest revision of this compendium was published May 6, 2011.

Recent changes to the compendium include:
-Revision of the list of references to include recent publications and disease outbreaks
-Update of information about indirect transmission of zoonotic infection through contact with contaminated areas and objects
-Addition of new procedures for intensive animal contact venues like farm day camps
-Expansion of information regarding zoonotic influenza

=== Compendium of Veterinary Standard Precautions for Zoonotic Disease Prevention in Veterinary Personnel ===
The purpose of this compendium is to raise awareness of zoonotic diseases and provide standardized procedures for veterinary practice and infection control.

The latest revision of this compendium was published in 2010.

== NASPHV Contributions ==
SPHVs study and provide the public with services such as:

- knowledge of and studies concerning antimicrobial resistance
- discovery and knowledge about 150 zoonotic diseases in the U.S.
- investigation of outbreaks of E. coli, cryptosporidiosis, pfiesteria, Salmonellosis, West Nile virus, Lyme disease, rabies
- exclusive knowledge/training concerning parasites, vectors, other hosts of zoonotic diseases
- management of animal control and animal welfare agencies
- preparation of guidelines for animals in schools and health care facilities
- investigation of occupational health problems
- composition of compendiums
