= Wet markets in China =

Markets selling perishable goods in China

Traditional market
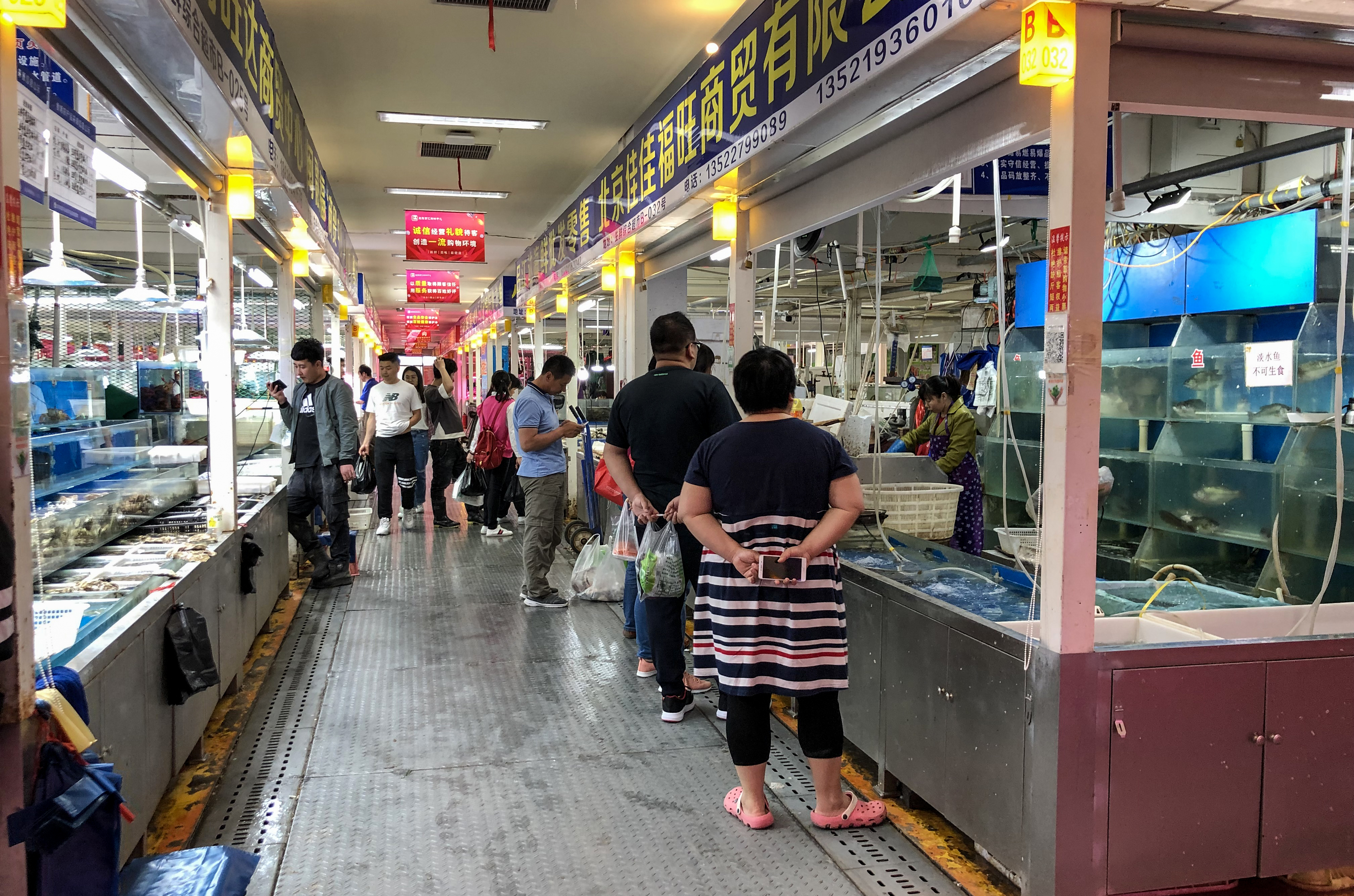
- Seafood section of Sanqi Baihui Market in Beijing
- Traditional Chinese: 傳統市場
- Simplified Chinese: 传统市场
- Hanyu Pinyin: chuántǒng shìchǎng
- Jyutping: cyun^{4} tung^{2} si^{5} coeng^{4}
- Literal meaning: traditional market
Transcriptions
Standard Mandarin
- Hanyu Pinyin: chuántǒng shìchǎng
Yue: Cantonese
- Jyutping: cyun^{4} tung^{2} si^{5} coeng^{4}

Alternative Chinese name
- Traditional Chinese: 街市
- Simplified Chinese: 街市
- Jyutping: gaai^{1} si^{5}
- Literal meaning: street market
Transcriptions
Yue: Cantonese
- Jyutping: gaai^{1} si^{5}
- IPA: [kaj˥.si˩˧]

In China, traditional food markets, referred to in English as wet markets, sell fresh meat, produce, and other perishable goods. The English term did not originate in mainland China, where these markets are called "farmers' markets" or "produce markets", and critics have described its pandemic-era use as fuelling Sinophobia. These markets are the most prevalent food outlet in urban regions of China but have faced increasing competition from supermarkets. Since the 1990s, those in large cities have been predominantly moved into modern indoor facilities.

Wildlife is not commonly sold in China's food markets, but poorly-regulated markets have been linked to the spread of zoonotic diseases, including the 2002–2004 SARS outbreak, 2013 avian influenza outbreak, and the COVID-19 pandemic. Small-scale wildlife farming emerged in China in the 1980s and expanded in the 1990s with government support. Wildlife was banned from Chinese markets in 2003, with further restrictions and enforcement in 2020 following the spread of COVID-19.

== Terminology ==
The English term "wet market" did not originate in mainland China; it was popularised by the Singaporean government in the 1970s. In mainland China, these markets are officially called nongmao shichang (农贸市场, "farmers' market") or cai shichang (菜市场, "produce market") and colloquially caichang (菜场); in Hong Kong Cantonese they are jieshi (街市, "street market"). Before 2020, most English speakers had never heard the term. Critics have argued that the word "wet" itself evokes unhygienic conditions, and anthropologists and journalists have described its use in pandemic-era Western coverage as fuelling Sinophobia.

== Modernization ==
Since the 1990s, large cities across China have moved traditional outdoor markets to modern indoor facilities. In 1999, all roadside markets in Hangzhou were banned and moved indoors. By 2014, all fresh food markets in Nanjing were moved indoors.

As of 2018, fresh food markets remain the most prevalent food outlet in urban regions of China despite the rise of supermarket chains since the 1990s. In 2016, a Meat & Livestock Australia study of imported meat consumers in 15 Chinese cities found that 39% of those consumers had purchased beef from a traditional market in the preceding month, while the same proportion had purchased beef from a supermarket in the preceding month. However, these markets have been losing ground in popularity compared to supermarkets, despite the fact they may be seen as healthier and more sustainable. Reports suggest "although there are well-managed, hygienic wet markets in and near bigger cities [in China], hygiene can be spotty, especially in smaller communities." During the 2010s, "smart markets" equipped with e-payment terminals emerged as traditional markets faced increasing competition from discount stores. Such markets also began facing competition from online grocery stores, such as Alibaba's Hema stores.

== Wildlife markets ==
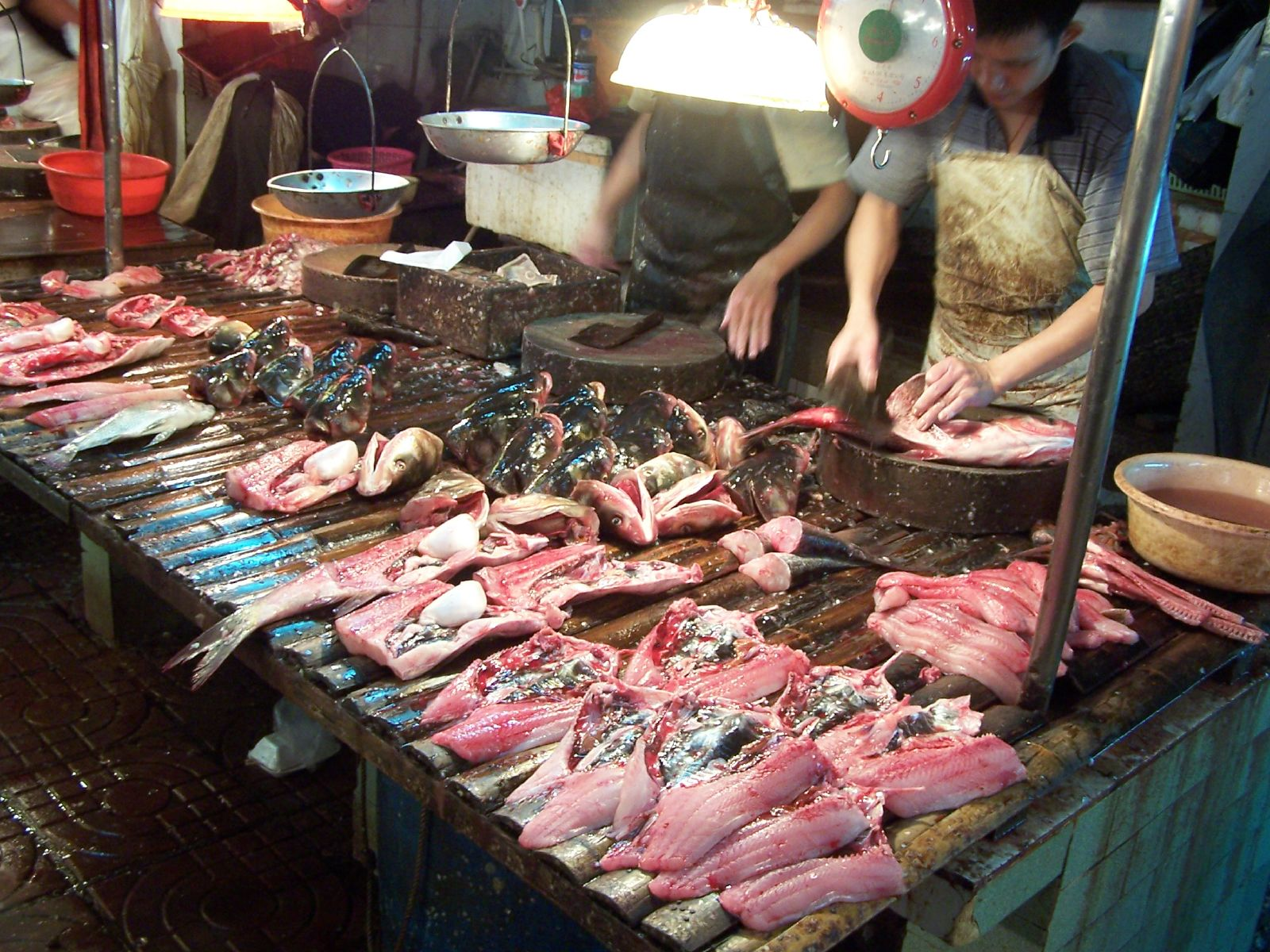
A fish stall in a market in Guangzhou

The trade of wildlife is not common in China, particularly in large cities, and most food markets in China do not contain live or wild animals besides fish held in tanks. In the early 1980s, small-scale wildlife farming began under the reform and opening up. It began to expand nationwide with government support in the 1990s, but was largely concentrated in the southeastern provinces.

Some poorly-regulated Chinese markets provided outlets for the wildlife trade industry that was estimated by the Chinese Academy of Engineering to employ roughly 14 million people and to be worth more than $73 billion in 2016, of which $59 billion was for fur rather than for food or medicinal purposes.

=== Disease outbreaks in wildlife markets ===
==== Bans following SARS and avian influenza outbreaks ====
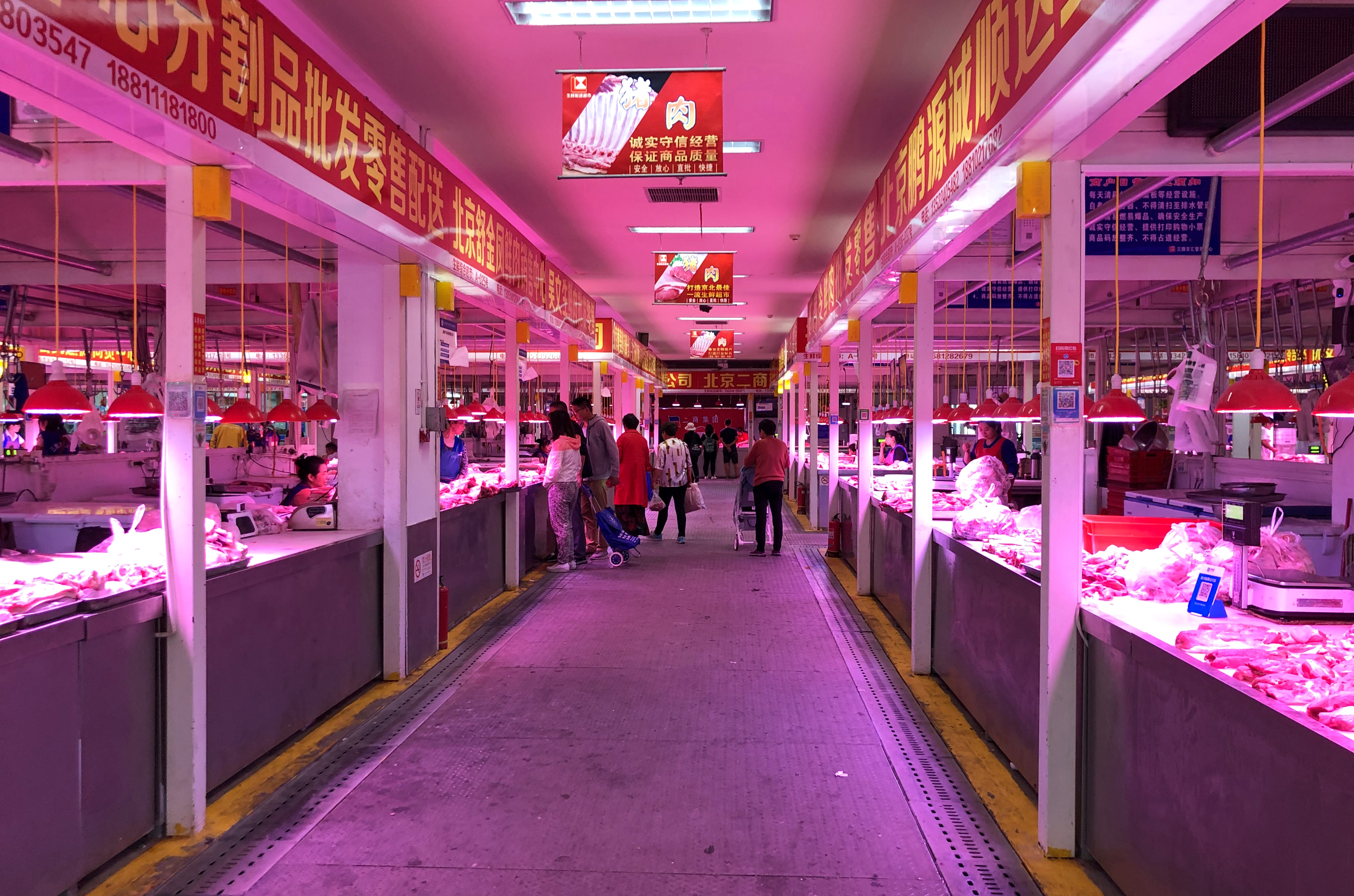
The pork section of the Sanqi Baihui Market in Beijing

In 2003, markets across China were banned from holding wildlife after the 2002–2004 SARS outbreak, which was directly tied to such practices. In 2014, live poultry was banned from all markets in Hangzhou due to the H7N9 avian influenza outbreak. Several provinces in China also banned the sale of live poultry following the avian influenza outbreak.

==== Links to the origin of COVID-19 ====
The exact origin of the COVID-19 pandemic is yet to be confirmed as of February 2021 and was originally linked to the Huanan Seafood Wholesale Market in Wuhan due to its early cluster of cases, although a 2021 World Health Organization (WHO) investigation concluded that the Huanan market was unlikely to be the origin due to the existence of earlier cases. Following the outbreak, epidemiology experts from China and a number of animal welfare organizations called to ban the operation of markets selling wild animals for human consumption.

The Huanan market's Chinese name, 华南海鲜批发市场, identifies it as a seafood wholesale market; with more than 1,000 stalls across roughly 50,000 square metres, it was the largest seafood wholesale market in central China. Its main goods were crab, shrimp and striped bass, with wildlife sold in a separate section. Some Western coverage presented "wet market" as its local name; NPR described it as "known in the region as a 'wet market'". The market was shut down on 1 January 2020. The Chinese government subsequently announced a temporary ban on the sale of wild animal products at markets on 26 January 2020, and then a permanent ban in February 2020 with an exception for traditional Chinese medicine ingredients, By 22 March 2020, at least 94% of the temporarily closed markets in China were reopened according to Chinese state-run media, without wild animals or wild meat. The reopening led to public criticism of the Chinese government's handling of the markets by Anthony Fauci and Lindsey Graham, although their criticisms have been attributed to semantic confusion between the terms "wet market" and "wildlife market". The WHO responded with the recommendation that such markets only be reopened "on the condition that they conform to stringent food safety and hygiene standards."

In April 2020, the Chinese government unveiled plans to further tighten restrictions on wildlife trade, with instructions and financial compensation for operations that were forcibly shut down. Deutsche Welle reported that by September 2020, the Chinese government had shut down almost all wildlife farms.

== Hong Kong ==
Markets in Hong Kong are governed by the law of Hong Kong. Since 31 December 1999, Hong Kong's public markets have been regulated by the Food and Environmental Hygiene Department (FEHD).

== See also ==
- Animal–industrial complex
