= Zoonosis =

Infection by a pathogen of non-human origin

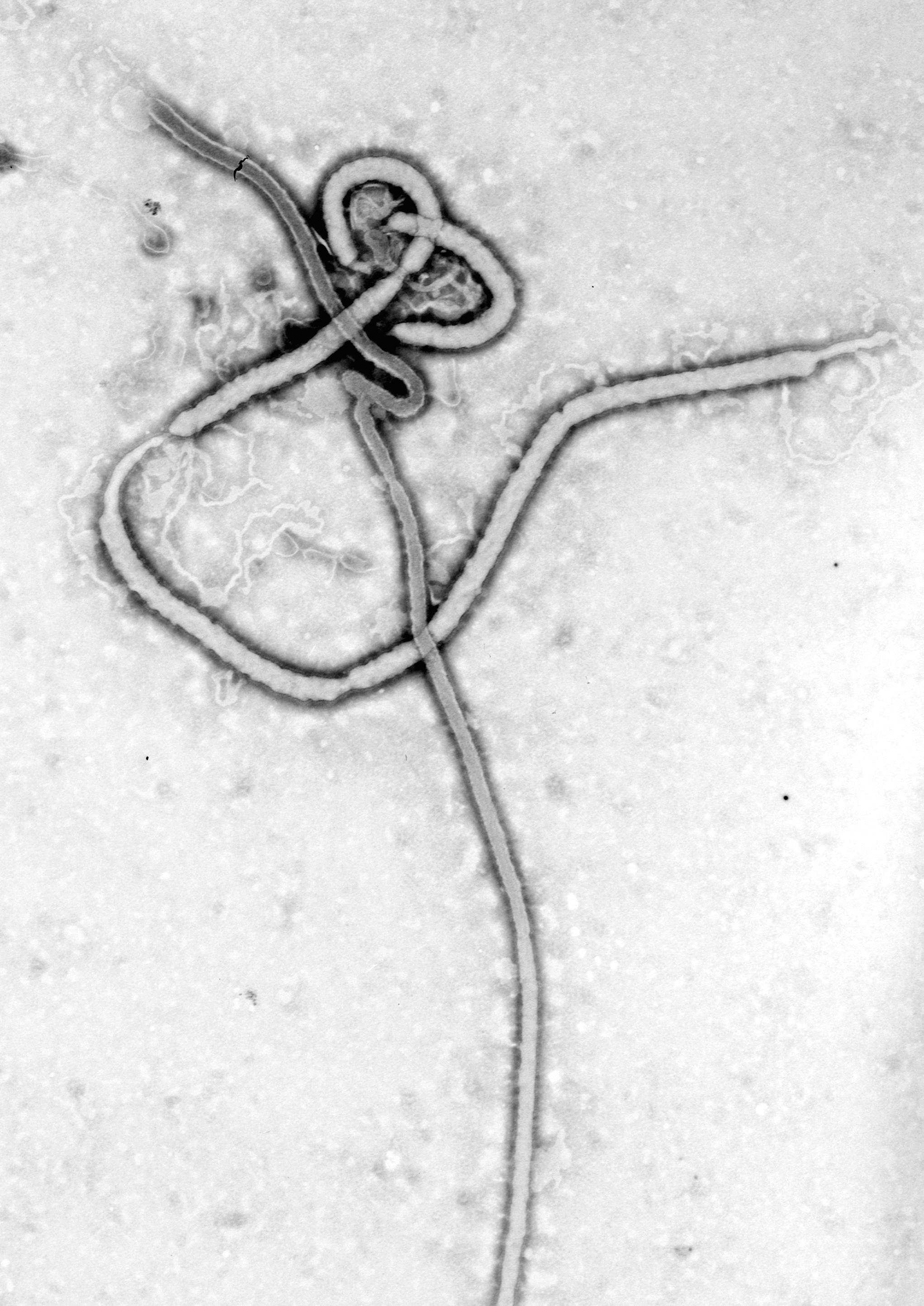
Transmission electron micrograph of Ebola virus

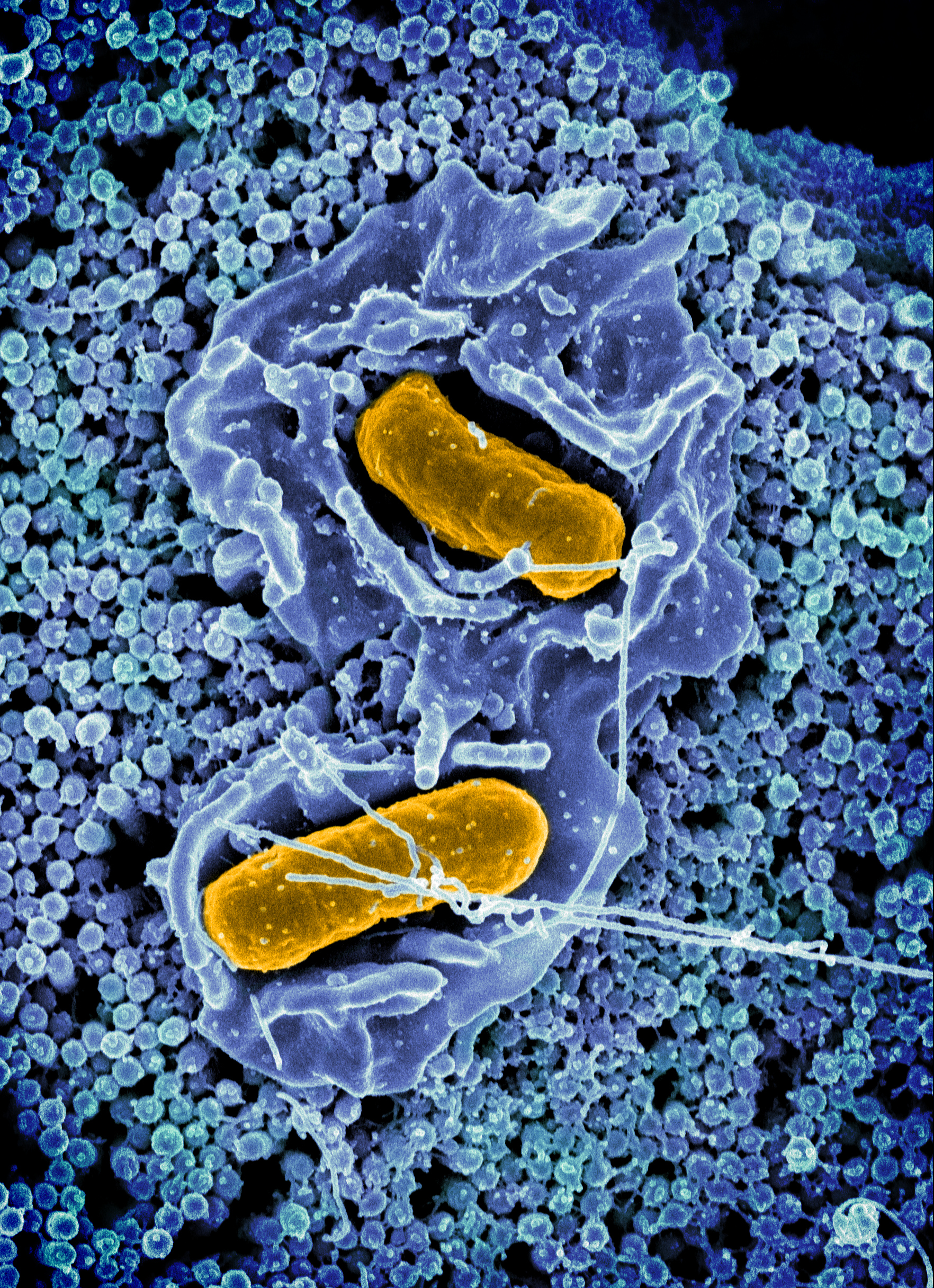
Salmonella Typhimurium invading a human epithelial cell

A zoonosis (/zoʊˈɒnəsɪs, ˌzoʊəˈnoʊsɪs/; pl.: zoonoses) or zoonotic disease is an infectious disease of humans caused by a pathogen (an infectious agent, such as a virus, bacterium, parasite, fungus or prion) which is transmitted from a non-human animal to a human. When humans infect non-humans, it is called reverse zoonosis or anthroponosis.

Major modern diseases such as Ebola and salmonellosis are zoonoses. HIV was a zoonotic disease transmitted to humans in the early part of the 20th century, though it has now evolved into a separate human-only disease. Human infection with animal influenza viruses is rare, as they do not transmit easily to or among humans. However, avian and swine influenza viruses in particular possess high zoonotic potential, and these occasionally recombine with human strains of the flu and can cause pandemics such as the 2009 swine flu. Zoonoses can be caused by a range of disease pathogens such as emergent viruses, bacteria, fungi and parasites; of 1,415 pathogens known to infect humans, 61% were zoonotic. Most human diseases originated in non-humans; however, only diseases that routinely involve non-human to human transmission, such as rabies, are considered direct zoonoses.

Zoonoses have different modes of transmission. In direct zoonosis the disease is directly transmitted between non-humans and humans through the air (influenza), bites and saliva (rabies).

Host genetics plays an important role in determining which non-human viruses will be able to make copies of themselves in the human body. Dangerous non-human viruses are those that require few mutations to begin replicating themselves in human cells. These viruses are potentially dangerous since the required combinations of mutations might randomly arise in the natural reservoir.

== Epidemiology ==
Zoonotic diseases account for a substantial proportion of infectious diseases affecting humans. It is estimated that approximately 60% of known human infectious diseases and up to 75% of emerging infectious diseases are zoonotic in origin.

Zoonotic diseases frequently emerge through spillover events, in which pathogens are transmitted from animal reservoirs to human populations. The likelihood of spillover is influenced by environmental and anthropogenic factors, including deforestation, land-use change, and increased human encroachment into wildlife habitats.

Disease emergence hotspots are often located in tropical regions where high biodiversity coincides with rapid human population growth and environmental disruption. Climate change further contributes by altering the distribution of vectors such as mosquitoes and ticks, thereby influencing transmission dynamics.

Examples of zoonotic diseases include Ebola virus disease, associated with wildlife reservoirs, and Rift Valley fever, which demonstrates climate-sensitive vector transmission patterns.

The transmission dynamics of zoonotic diseases vary widely. Some infections result in limited human-to-human transmission, while others may sustain outbreaks depending on factors such as the pathogen's basic reproduction number (R_{0}), population density, and the effectiveness of public health interventions.

== Causes ==
=== Urban wildlife and disease transmission ===
Urban wildlife includes animals that live in cities and suburbs, such as rodents, pigeons, bats, and raccoons. Urbanization can increase contact between humans, domestic animals, and wildlife, creating opportunities for zoonotic disease transmission.

Rodents are among the most important urban reservoirs for zoonotic pathogens. They can spread diseases to humans through bites, scratches, contaminated food, or contact with urine, saliva, or droppings. Diseases associated with rodents include leptospirosis, hantavirus infection, salmonellosis, and rat-bite fever.

Urban birds may also contribute to disease exposure in some settings. Pigeon droppings are associated with fungal infections such as histoplasmosis and cryptococcosis, typically through inhalation of contaminated dust.

Wild mammals adapted to urban environments can also contribute to zoonotic risk. Rabies is a zoonotic viral disease affecting mammals, including wildlife such as bats and raccoons.

A One Health approach is used to address zoonotic disease risks by integrating human, animal, and environmental health. Prevention strategies include improving sanitation, waste management, controlling wildlife populations, and strengthening public health surveillance systems. The emergence of zoonotic diseases originated with the domestication of animals. Zoonotic transmission can occur in any context in which there is contact with or consumption of animals, animal products, or animal derivatives. This can occur in a companionistic (pets), economic (farming, trade, butchering, etc.), predatory (hunting, butchering, or consuming wild game), or research context.

Recently, there has been a rise in frequency of appearance of new zoonotic diseases. "Approximately 1.67 million undescribed viruses are thought to exist in mammals and birds, up to half of which are estimated to have the potential to spill over into humans", says a study led by researchers at the University of California, Davis. According to a report from the United Nations Environment Programme and International Livestock Research Institute a large part of the causes are environmental like climate change, unsustainable agriculture, exploitation of wildlife, and land use change. Others are linked to changes in human society such as an increase in mobility. The organizations propose a set of measures to stop the rise.

=== Contamination of food or water supply ===
Foodborne zoonotic diseases are caused by a variety of pathogens that can affect both humans and animals. The most significant zoonotic pathogens causing foodborne diseases are:

==== Bacterial pathogens ====
Escherichia coli O157:H7, Campylobacter, Caliciviridae, and Salmonella.

==== Viral pathogens ====
- Hepatitis E: Hepatitis E virus (HEV) is primarily transmitted through pork products, especially in developing countries with limited sanitation. The infection can lead to acute liver disease and is particularly dangerous for pregnant women.
- Norovirus: Often found in contaminated shellfish and fresh produce, norovirus is a leading cause of foodborne illness globally. It spreads easily and causes symptoms like vomiting, diarrhea, and stomach pain.

==== Parasitic pathogens ====
- Toxoplasma gondii: This parasite is commonly found in undercooked meat, especially pork and lamb, and can cause toxoplasmosis. While typically mild, toxoplasmosis can be severe in immunocompromised individuals and pregnant women, potentially leading to complications.
- Trichinella spp. is transmitted through undercooked pork and wild game, causing trichinellosis. Symptoms range from mild gastrointestinal distress to severe muscle pain and, in rare cases, can be fatal.

=== Farming, ranching and animal husbandry ===
According to the U.S. Centers for Disease Control and Prevention (CDC), farms on which animals are intensively reared can cause adverse health reactions in farm workers. Workers may develop acute and chronic lung disease, musculoskeletal injuries, and may catch infections that transmit from animals to human beings (such as tuberculosis). Communities living near these farms are at risk of respiratory illnesses, methicillin-resistant Staphylococcus aureus (MRSA), Q fever, and stress impacts.

Glanders primarily affects those who work closely with horses and donkeys. Close contact with cattle can lead to cutaneous anthrax infection, whereas inhalation anthrax infection is more common for workers in slaughterhouses, tanneries, and wool mills. Close contact with sheep who have recently given birth can lead to infection with the bacterium Chlamydia psittaci, causing chlamydiosis (and enzootic abortion in pregnant women), as well as increase the risk of Q fever, toxoplasmosis, and listeriosis, in the pregnant or otherwise immunocompromised. Echinococcosis is caused by a tapeworm, which can spread from infected sheep by food or water contaminated by feces or wool. Avian influenza is common in chickens, and, while it is rare in humans, the main public health worry is that a strain of avian influenza will recombine with a human influenza virus and cause a pandemic like the 1918 Spanish flu. In 2017, free-range chickens in the UK were temporarily ordered to remain inside due to the threat of avian influenza. Cattle are an important reservoir of cryptosporidiosis, which mainly affects the immunocompromised. Reports have shown mink can also become infected. In Western countries, hepatitis E burden is largely dependent on exposure to animal products, and pork is a significant source of infection, in this respect. Similarly, the human coronavirus OC43, the main cause of the common cold, can use the pig as a zoonotic reservoir, constantly reinfecting the human population.

Veterinarians are exposed to unique occupational hazards when it comes to zoonotic disease. In the US, studies have highlighted an increased risk of injuries and lack of veterinary awareness of these hazards. Research has proved the importance for continued clinical veterinarian education on occupational risks associated with musculoskeletal injuries, animal bites, needle-sticks, and cuts.

A July 2020 report by the United Nations Environment Programme stated that the increase in zoonotic pandemics is directly attributable to anthropogenic destruction of nature and the increased global demand for meat and that the industrial farming of pigs and chickens in particular will be a primary risk factor for the spillover of zoonotic diseases in the future. Habitat loss of viral reservoir species has been identified as a significant source in at least one spillover event.

=== Wildlife trade or animal attacks ===
The wildlife trade may increase spillover risk because it directly increases the number of interactions across animal species, sometimes in small spaces. The origin of the COVID-19 pandemic is traced to the wet markets in China.

Zoonotic disease emergence is demonstrably linked to the consumption of wildlife meat, exacerbated by human encroachment into natural habitats and amplified by the unsanitary conditions of wildlife markets. These markets, where diverse species converge, facilitate the mixing and transmission of pathogens, including those responsible for outbreaks of HIV-1, Ebola, and mpox, and potentially even the COVID-19 pandemic. Notably, small mammals often harbor a vast array of zoonotic bacteria and viruses, yet endemic bacterial transmission among wildlife remains largely unexplored.

=== Insect vectors ===
- African sleeping sickness
- Dirofilariasis
- Eastern equine encephalitis
- Japanese encephalitis
- Saint Louis encephalitis
- Scrub typhus
- Tularemia
- Venezuelan equine encephalitis
- West Nile fever
- Western equine encephalitis
- Zika fever

=== Pets ===
Pets can transmit a number of diseases. Dogs and cats are routinely vaccinated against rabies. Pets can also transmit ringworm and Giardia, which are endemic in both animal and human populations. Toxoplasmosis is a common infection of cats; in humans it is a mild disease although it can be dangerous to pregnant women. Dirofilariasis is caused by Dirofilaria immitis through mosquitoes infected by mammals like dogs and cats. Cat-scratch disease is caused by Bartonella henselae and Bartonella quintana, which are transmitted by fleas that are endemic to cats. Toxocariasis is the infection of humans by any of species of roundworm, including species specific to dogs (Toxocara canis) or cats (Toxocara cati). Cryptosporidiosis can be spread to humans from pet lizards, such as the leopard gecko. Encephalitozoon cuniculi is a microsporidial parasite carried by many mammals, including rabbits, and is an important opportunistic pathogen in people immunocompromised by HIV/AIDS, organ transplantation, or CD4+ T-lymphocyte deficiency.

Pets may also serve as a reservoir of viral disease and contribute to the chronic presence of certain viral diseases in the human population. For instance, approximately 20% of domestic dogs, cats, and horses carry anti-hepatitis E virus antibodies and thus these animals probably contribute to human hepatitis E burden as well. For non-vulnerable populations (e.g., people who are not immunocompromised) the associated disease burden is, however, small. Furthermore, the trade of non-domestic animals such as wild animals as pets can also increase the risk of zoonosis spread.

Bats are frequently unjustly portrayed as the primary instigators of the ongoing COVID-19 epidemic; nevertheless, the true origins of this and other zoonotic spillover occurrences should be attributed to human environmental impacts, especially the proliferation of pets. For example, bat predation by cats poses a significant danger to biodiversity conservation and carries zoonotic consequences that must be acknowledged.

=== Exhibition ===
Outbreaks of zoonoses have been traced to human interaction with, and exposure to, other animals at fairs, live animal markets, petting zoos, and other settings. In 2005, the Centers for Disease Control and Prevention (CDC) issued an updated list of recommendations for preventing zoonosis transmission in public settings. The recommendations, developed in conjunction with the National Association of State Public Health Veterinarians, include educational responsibilities of venue operators, limiting public animal contact, and animal care and management.

=== Hunting and bushmeat ===
Hunting involves humans tracking, chasing, and capturing wild animals, primarily for food or materials like fur. However, other reasons like pest control or managing wildlife populations can also exist. Transmission of zoonotic diseases, those leaping from animals to humans, can occur through various routes: direct physical contact, airborne droplets or particles, bites or vector transport by insects, oral ingestion, or even contact with contaminated environments. Wildlife activities like hunting and trade bring humans closer to dangerous zoonotic pathogens, threatening global health.

According to the Center for Diseases Control and Prevention (CDC) hunting and consuming wild animal meat ("bushmeat") in regions like Africa can expose people to infectious diseases due to the types of animals involved, like bats and primates. Unfortunately, common preservation methods like smoking or drying aren't enough to eliminate these risks. Although bushmeat provides protein and income for many, the practice is intricately linked to numerous emerging infectious diseases like Ebola, HIV, and SARS, raising critical public health concerns.

A review published in 2022 found evidence that zoonotic spillover linked to wildmeat consumption has been reported across all continents.

=== Deforestation, biodiversity loss and environmental degradation ===
Kate Jones, Chair of Ecology and Biodiversity at University College London, says zoonotic diseases are increasingly linked to environmental change and human behavior. The disruption of pristine forests driven by logging, mining, road building through remote places, rapid urbanization, and population growth is bringing people into closer contact with animal species they may never have been near before. The resulting transmission of disease from wildlife to humans, she says, is now "a hidden cost of human economic development". In a guest article, published by IPBES, President of the EcoHealth Alliance and zoologist Peter Daszak, along with three co-chairs of the 2019 Global Assessment Report on Biodiversity and Ecosystem Services, Josef Settele, Sandra Díaz, and Eduardo Brondizio, wrote that "rampant deforestation, uncontrolled expansion of agriculture, intensive farming, mining and infrastructure development, as well as the exploitation of wild species have created a 'perfect storm' for the spillover of diseases from wildlife to people."

Joshua Moon, Clare Wenham, and Sophie Harman said that there is evidence that decreased biodiversity has an effect on the diversity of hosts and frequency of human-animal interactions with potential for pathogenic spillover.

An April 2020 study, published in the Proceedings of the Royal Society's Part B journal, found that increased virus spillover events from animals to humans can be linked to biodiversity loss and environmental degradation, as humans further encroach on wildlands to engage in agriculture, hunting, and resource extraction they become exposed to pathogens which normally would remain in these areas. Such spillover events have been tripling every decade since 1980. An August 2020 study, published in Nature, concludes that the anthropogenic destruction of ecosystems for the purpose of expanding agriculture and human settlements reduces biodiversity and allows for smaller animals such as bats and rats, which are more adaptable to human pressures and also carry the most zoonotic diseases, to proliferate. This in turn can result in more pandemics.

In October 2020, the Intergovernmental Science-Policy Platform on Biodiversity and Ecosystem Services published its report on the 'era of pandemics' by 22 experts in a variety of fields and concluded that anthropogenic destruction of biodiversity is paving the way to the pandemic era and could result in as many as 850,000 viruses being transmitted from animals – in particular birds and mammals – to humans. The increased pressure on ecosystems is being driven by the "exponential rise" in consumption and trade of commodities such as meat, palm oil, and metals, largely facilitated by developed nations, and by a growing human population. According to Peter Daszak, the chair of the group who produced the report, "there is no great mystery about the cause of the Covid-19 pandemic, or of any modern pandemic. The same human activities that drive climate change and biodiversity loss also drive pandemic risk through their impacts on our environment."

=== Climate change ===
According to a report from the United Nations Environment Programme and International Livestock Research Institute, entitled "Preventing the next pandemic – Zoonotic diseases and how to break the chain of transmission", climate change is one of the 7 human-related causes of the increase in the number of zoonotic diseases. The University of Sydney issued a study, in March 2021, that examines factors increasing the likelihood of epidemics and pandemics like the COVID-19 pandemic. The researchers found that "pressure on ecosystems, climate change and economic development are key factors" in doing so. More zoonotic diseases were found in high-income countries.

A 2022 study dedicated to the link between climate change and zoonosis found a strong link between climate change and the epidemic emergence in the last 15 years, as it caused a massive migration of species to new areas, and consequently contact between species which do not normally come in contact with one another. Even in a scenario with weak climatic changes, there will be 15,000 spillover of viruses to new hosts in the next decades. The areas with the most possibilities for spillover are the mountainous tropical regions of Africa and southeast Asia. Southeast Asia is especially vulnerable as it has a large number of bat species that generally do not mix, but could easily if climate change forced them to begin migrating.

A 2021 study found possible links between climate change and transmission of COVID-19 through bats. The authors suggest that climate-driven changes in the distribution and robustness of bat species harboring coronaviruses may have occurred in eastern Asian hotspots (southern China, Myanmar, and Laos), constituting a driver behind the evolution and spread of the virus.

=== Mechanisms linking climate change and zoonotic diseases ===
Climate change can influence zoonotic disease transmission through changes in ecosystems, wildlife distribution, and vector populations. Rising temperatures, altered rainfall patterns, and increased frequency of extreme weather events can affect the survival, reproduction, and geographic distribution of disease vectors such as mosquitoes, ticks, and rodents. These environmental changes can increase the risk of pathogen transmission between animals and humans. Climate change may also disrupt ecological balances, leading to increased contact between wildlife, livestock, and human populations and increasing the likelihood of zoonotic spillover events.

=== Changes in vector distribution ===
Climate change can expand the geographic range and seasonal activity of disease vectors. Warmer temperatures and changes in precipitation can allow mosquitoes and ticks to survive in regions that were previously too cold or dry for them. As a result, vector-borne zoonotic diseases such as Lyme disease, dengue fever, and West Nile virus have expanded into new geographic regions, particularly at higher latitudes and elevations. These changes pose challenges for public health systems because populations in newly affected areas may have little immunity or preparedness for these diseases.

=== Wildlife migration and spillover risk ===
Climate change can alter wildlife migration patterns, habitat availability, and food sources, which may force animals to move into new areas or closer to human settlements. Increased interaction between wildlife, livestock, and humans can increase the risk of zoonotic spillover events. Habitat destruction, biodiversity loss, and environmental stress can also increase the number of reservoir species that carry zoonotic pathogens, such as rodents and bats, which are known reservoirs for many emerging infectious diseases.

=== One Health approach and prevention strategies ===
The relationship between climate change and zoonotic diseases is often addressed using the One Health approach, which recognizes the interconnected health of humans, animals, and the environment. One Health strategies include integrated disease surveillance, environmental monitoring, wildlife health monitoring, vector control programs, and public health education. Climate change adaptation strategies such as sustainable land use, environmental protection, and biodiversity conservation are also considered important components of zoonotic disease prevention. Recent approaches to the prevention of zoonotic diseases increasingly emphasize integrated and interdisciplinary strategies consistent with the One Health framework, which recognizes the interconnectedness of human, animal, and environmental health.

Key strategies include integrated surveillance systems that monitor diseases across human and animal populations, enabling early detection and rapid response to emerging threats. Advances in genomic surveillance and predictive modeling are increasingly used to identify potential outbreaks before they spread widely.

Additional prevention measures include vaccination programs where applicable, improved food safety practices, and regulation of wildlife trade. Reducing risk at the human–animal interface is critical for preventing spillover events.

Effective control of zoonotic diseases depends on collaboration between public health professionals, veterinarians, environmental scientists, and policymakers.

=== Secondary transmission ===
Zoonotic diseases contribute significantly to the burdened public health system as vulnerable groups such the elderly, children, childbearing women and immune-compromised individuals are at risk. According to the World Health Organization (WHO), any disease or infection that is primarily "naturally" transmissible from vertebrate animals to humans or from humans to animals is classified as a zoonosis. Factors such as climate change, urbanization, animal migration and trade, travel and tourism, vector biology, anthropogenic factors, and natural factors have greatly influenced the emergence, re-emergence, distribution, and patterns of zoonoses.

Zoonotic diseases generally refer to diseases of animal origin in which direct or vector mediated animal-to-human transmission is the usual source of human infection. Animal populations are the principal reservoir of the pathogen and horizontal infection in humans is rare. A few examples in this category include lyssavirus infections, Lyme borreliosis, plague, tularemia, leptospirosis, ehrlichiosis, Nipah virus, West Nile virus, and hantavirus infections. Secondary transmission encompasses a category of diseases of animal origin in which the actual transmission to humans is a rare event but, once it has occurred, human-to-human transmission maintains the infection cycle for some period of time. Some examples include human immunodeficiency virus (HIV)/acquired immune deficiency syndrome (AIDS), certain influenza A strains, Ebola virus and severe acute respiratory syndrome (SARS).

One example is Ebola, which is spread by direct transmission to humans from handling bushmeat (wild animals hunted for food) and contact with infected bats or close contact with infected animals, including chimpanzees, fruit bats, and forest antelope. Secondary transmission also occurs from human to human by direct contact with blood, bodily fluids, or skin of patients with or who died of Ebola virus disease. Some examples of pathogens with this pattern of secondary transmission are human immunodeficiency virus/acquired immune deficiency syndrome, influenza A, Ebola virus, and SARS. Recent infections of these emerging and re-emerging zoonotic infections have occurred as a results of many ecological and sociological changes globally.

== Environmental drivers of zoonotic disease emergence ==
Environmental changes are major drivers of zoonotic disease emergence and transmission. Human activities such as deforestation, urbanization, agricultural expansion, biodiversity loss, and wildlife trade can alter ecosystems and increase contact between humans, livestock, and wildlife reservoirs of disease. These environmental changes can create new pathways for pathogens to spread between species and increase the risk of zoonotic spillover events.

Deforestation and land-use change are particularly associated with emerging infectious diseases because they disrupt natural habitats and bring humans into closer contact with wildlife species that may carry zoonotic pathogens. Agricultural expansion and livestock production can also increase interactions between domestic animals and wildlife, facilitating disease transmission across species.

Urbanization can contribute to zoonotic disease transmission by increasing population density, waste accumulation, and rodent populations that can serve as reservoirs for zoonotic pathogens. Water contamination and poor waste management can also contribute to zoonotic disease transmission through exposure to contaminated water sources and environments.

Biodiversity loss has also been linked to increased zoonotic disease risk because ecosystems with reduced biodiversity may favor species that are efficient reservoirs of disease, such as rodents and bats. For these reasons, environmental management and ecosystem conservation are considered important strategies for preventing zoonotic disease emergence.

== One Health approach ==
The One Health approach is a collaborative, multidisciplinary strategy used to prevent and control zoonotic diseases by recognizing the interconnected health of humans, animals, and the environment. The approach involves collaboration between public health professionals, veterinarians, environmental scientists, ecologists, and policymakers to address the complex factors that contribute to zoonotic disease transmission.

One Health strategies for zoonotic disease prevention include integrated disease surveillance in humans and animals, vaccination programs for livestock and companion animals, vector control programs, environmental management, and public health education. Monitoring wildlife health and environmental conditions can help identify emerging disease risks and allow for early intervention before widespread transmission occurs.

International organizations such as the World Health Organization (WHO), the Food and Agriculture Organization (FAO), and the World Organization for Animal Health (WOAH) promote the One Health approach to address zoonotic diseases, antimicrobial resistance, food safety, and emerging infectious diseases through coordinated global health strategies. The One Health approach is considered an important framework for addressing global health challenges that involve interactions between humans, animals, and the environment.

One health follows the spillover infections theory, which is a conceptual framework that asserts that zoonosis occurs as part of a linear progression of disease. First, the disease must circulate and propagate within the non-human animal species' population. Once the pathogen load is sufficiently high, the disease then becomes able to overcome barriers that prevent zoonosis. These barriers are different depending on whether the species in question is wildlife or livestock. For example, a pathogen in a wildlife species must overcome barriers that include limited direct contact with humans or a wide distribution range of the host species, while a pathogen in a livestock population must overcome antibiotic use or evade early detection by veterinarians.

Once these barriers are overcome, the disease can "spill over" into the human population, becoming an emerging disease. If left unchecked, localized transmission then causes the disease to progress to the epidemic stage, and finally, the pandemic stage.

This model allows practitioners to correlate preventive measures to the current stage of disease. During emergence, the main preventive measure is early detection. In the localized transmission stage, containment can be used to control the disease. Once the disease has reached epidemic or pandemic status, the prevention strategy becomes multifaceted, using a combination of all previous measures brought to a larger scale.

== Prevention and surveillance ==
Preventing zoonotic diseases requires coordinated surveillance and prevention strategies across human health, animal health, and environmental sectors. Surveillance systems monitor disease occurrence in humans, livestock, wildlife, and vectors to detect outbreaks and emerging diseases early and allow for rapid public health response.

Prevention strategies include improving sanitation and water quality, controlling disease vectors such as mosquitoes and ticks, regulating wildlife trade, improving farm biosecurity, and promoting responsible antibiotic use in humans and animals. Vaccination programs for animals, particularly livestock and domestic animals, are also important for preventing zoonotic disease transmission to humans.

Public education campaigns play an important role in reducing zoonotic disease transmission by encouraging safe food handling, hand hygiene, and avoiding contact with sick animals. Climate change adaptation strategies, environmental protection, and sustainable land-use planning are increasingly recognized as important components of zoonotic disease prevention and control.

== History ==
During most of human prehistory groups of hunter-gatherers were probably very small. Such groups probably made contact with other such bands only rarely. Such isolation would have caused epidemic diseases to be restricted to any given local population, because propagation and expansion of epidemics depend on frequent contact with other individuals who have not yet developed an adequate immune response. To persist in such a population, a pathogen either had to be a chronic infection, staying present and potentially infectious in the infected host for long periods, or it had to have other additional species as reservoir where it can maintain itself until further susceptible hosts are contacted and infected. In fact, for many "human" diseases, the human is actually better viewed as an accidental or incidental victim and a dead-end host. Examples include rabies, anthrax, tularemia, and West Nile fever. Thus, much of human exposure to infectious disease has been zoonotic.

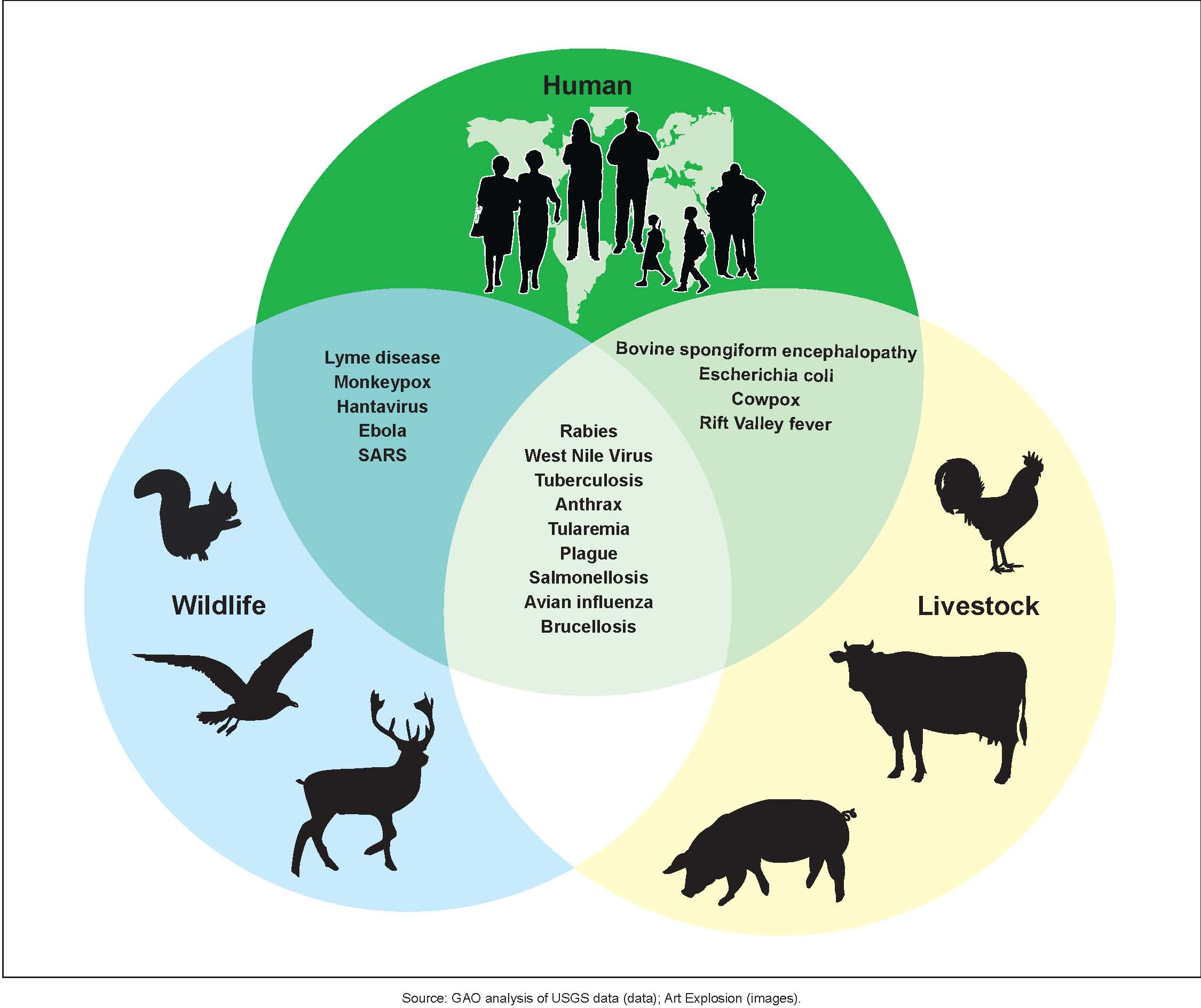
Possibilities for zoonotic disease transmissions

Many diseases, even epidemic ones, have zoonotic origin and measles, smallpox, influenza, HIV, and diphtheria are particular examples. Various forms of the common cold and tuberculosis also are adaptations of strains originating in other species. Some experts have suggested that all human viral infections were originally zoonotic.

Zoonoses are of interest because they are often previously unrecognized diseases or have increased virulence in populations lacking immunity. The West Nile virus first appeared in the United States in 1999, in the New York City area. Bubonic plague is a zoonotic disease, as are salmonellosis, Rocky Mountain spotted fever, and Lyme disease.

A major factor contributing to the appearance of new zoonotic pathogens in human populations is increased contact between humans and wildlife. This can be caused either by encroachment of human activity into wilderness areas or by movement of wild animals into areas of human activity. An example of this is the outbreak of Nipah virus in peninsular Malaysia, in 1999, when intensive pig farming began within the habitat of infected fruit bats. The unidentified infection of these pigs amplified the force of infection, transmitting the virus to farmers, and eventually causing 105 human deaths.

Similarly, in recent times avian influenza and West Nile virus have spilled over into human populations probably due to interactions between the carrier host and domestic animals. Highly mobile animals, such as bats and birds, may present a greater risk of zoonotic transmission than other animals due to the ease with which they can move into areas of human habitation.

Because they depend on the human host for part of their life-cycle, diseases such as African schistosomiasis, river blindness, and elephantiasis are not defined as zoonotic, even though they may depend on transmission by insects or other vectors.

== Use in vaccines ==
The first vaccine against smallpox by Edward Jenner in 1800 was by infection of a zoonotic bovine virus which caused a disease called cowpox. Jenner had noticed that milkmaids were resistant to smallpox. Milkmaids contracted a milder version of the disease from infected cows that conferred cross immunity to the human disease. Jenner abstracted an infectious preparation of 'cowpox' and subsequently used it to inoculate persons against smallpox. As a result of vaccination, smallpox has been eradicated globally, and mass inoculation against this disease ceased in 1981. There are a variety of vaccine types, including traditional inactivated pathogen vaccines, subunit vaccines, live attenuated vaccines. There are also new vaccine technologies such as viral vector vaccines and DNA/RNA vaccines, which include many of the COVID-19 vaccines.

== See also ==
- Animal welfare#Animal welfare organizations – Well-being of non-human animals
- Conservation medicine – Interdisciplinary field
- Cross-species transmission – Transmission of a pathogen between different species
- Emerging infectious disease – New or rapidly increasing disease
- Foodborne illness – Illness from eating spoiled or contaminated food
- Spillover infection – Transmission of a pathogen into a new host species
- Wildlife disease – Disease affecting wild animal species
- Veterinary medicine – Branch of medicine for non-human animals
- Wildlife smuggling and zoonoses – Health risks associated with the trade in exotic wildlife
- List of zoonotic primate viruses

== Bibliography ==
- Bardosh K (2016). One Health: Science, Politics and Zoonotic Disease in Africa. London: Routledge. ISBN 978-1-138-96148-7..
- Crawford D (2018). Deadly Companions: How Microbes Shaped our History. Oxford University Press. ISBN 978-0-19-881544-0.
- Felbab-Brown V (6 October 2020). "Preventing the next zoonotic pandemic". Brookings Institution. Archived from the original on 21 January 2021.
- Greger M (2007). "The human/animal interface: emergence and resurgence of zoonotic infectious diseases". Critical Reviews in Microbiology. 33 (4): 243–299. doi:10.1080/10408410701647594. PMID 18033595. S2CID 8940310. Archived from the original on 1 August 2020.
- H. Krauss, A. Weber, M. Appel, B. Enders, A. v. Graevenitz, H. D. Isenberg, H. G. Schiefer, W. Slenczka, H. Zahner: Zoonoses. Infectious Diseases Transmissible from Animals to Humans. 3rd Edition, 456 pages. ASM Press. American Society for Microbiology, Washington, D.C., 2003. ISBN 1-55581-236-8.
- González JG (2010). Infection Risk and Limitation of Fundamental Rights by Animal-To-Human Transplantations. EU, Spanish and German Law with Special Consideration of English Law (in German). Hamburg: Verlag Dr. Kovac. ISBN 978-3-8300-4712-4.
- Quammen D (2013). Spillover: Animal Infections and the Next Human Pandemic. W. W. Norton & Company. ISBN 978-0-393-34661-9.
