= Influenza A virus subtype H6N2 =

Virus classification
- (unranked): Virus
- Realm: Riboviria
- Kingdom: Orthornavirae
- Phylum: Negarnaviricota
- Class: Insthoviricetes
- Order: Articulavirales
- Family: Orthomyxoviridae
- Genus: Alphainfluenzavirus
- Species: Influenza A virus
- Serotype: Influenza A virus subtype H6N2

Avian influenza virus

H6N2 is an avian influenza virus with two forms: one has a low and the other a high pathogenicity. It can cause a serious problem for poultry, and also infects ducks as well. H6N2 subtype is considered to be a non-pathogenic chicken virus, the host still unknown, but could strain from feral animals, and/or aquatic bird reservoirs. H6N2 along with H6N6 are viruses that are found to replicate in mice without preadaptation, and some have acquired the ability to bind to human-like receptors. Genetic markers for H6N2 include 22-amino acid stalk deletion in neuraminidase (NA) protein gene, increased N-glycosylation, and a D144 mutation of the Haemagglutinin (HA) protein gene. Transmission of avian influenza viruses from wild aquatic birds to domestic birds usually cause subclinical infections, and occasionally, respiratory disease and drops in egg production. Some histological features presented in chicken infected with H6N2 are fibrinous yolk peritonitis, salpingitis, oophoritis, nephritis, along with swollen kidneys as well.

== Signs and symptoms ==
- sneezing and lacrimation
- prostration
- anorexia and fever
- sometimes swelling of the infraorbital sinuses with nasal mucous
