= List of vaccine topics =

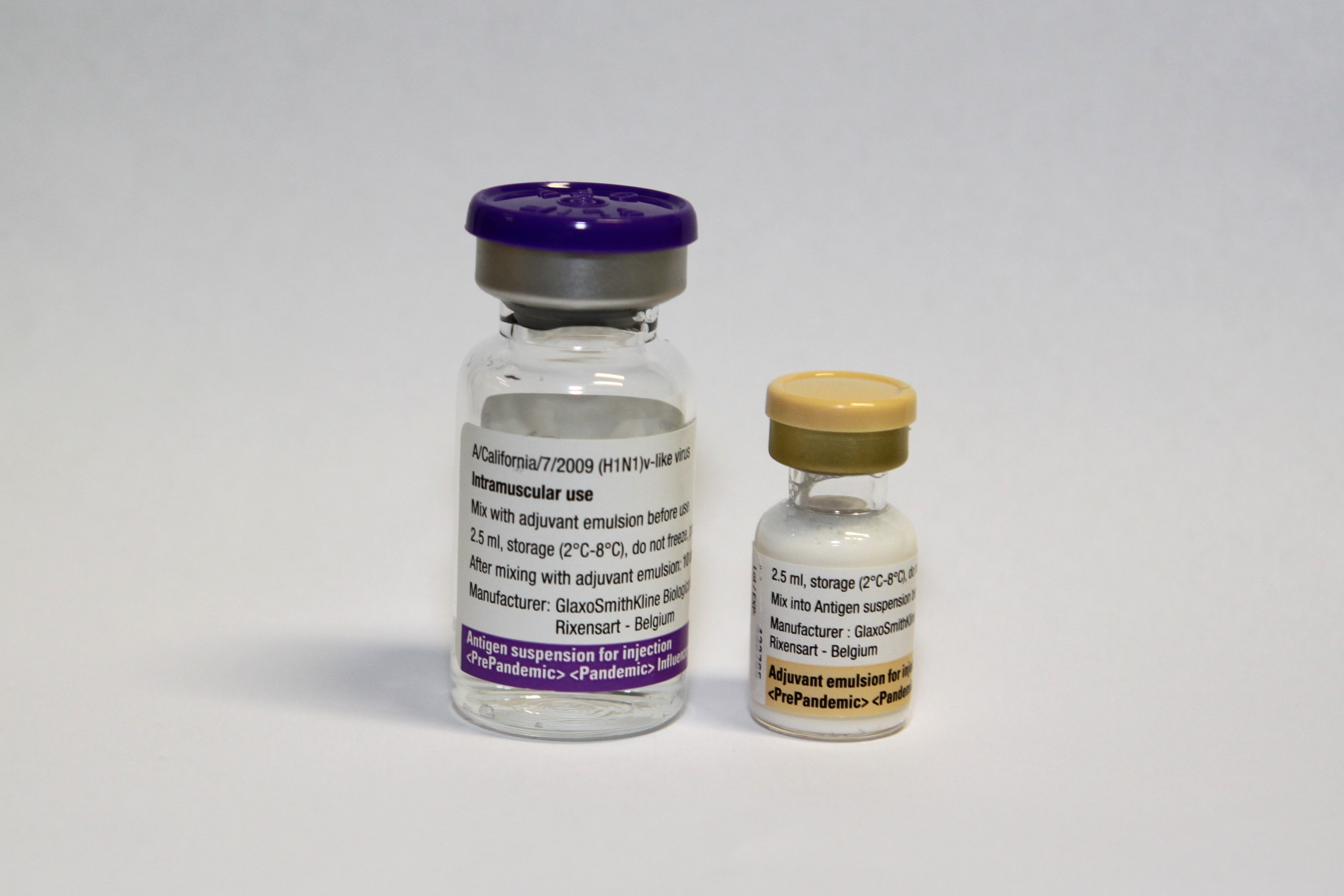
Flu vaccines used during the flu in 2009

This is a list of vaccine-related topics.

A vaccine is a biological preparation that improves immunity to a particular disease. A vaccine typically contains an agent that resembles a disease-causing microorganism, and is often made from weakened or killed forms of the microbe or its toxins. The agent stimulates the body's immune system to recognize the agent as foreign, destroy it, and "remember" it, so that the immune system can more easily recognize and destroy any of these microorganisms that it later encounters.

== Human vaccines ==
In the tables below, a brand might not be linked for one of two reasons: the brand name has neither an article or a redirect, or the brand name redirect points at the row's Vaccine Article (indicating no independent article). Some vaccines have been marked as 'discontinued' based on information in the target article.

=== Viral diseases ===
List of vaccines for viral diseases
Vaccine(s)	Virus	Virus type	Diseases or conditions	Brands
Chikungunya vaccine	Chikungunya virus	RNA	Chikungunya	Ixchiq, Vimkunya
COVID-19 vaccine	Coronavirus	RNA	COVID-19	Comirnaty; Convidecia; CoronaVac (discontinued); Covaxin; Spikevax; Covishield; CoviVac; Covovax; EpiVacCorona; Jcovden; Sinopharm BIBP; Sinopharm WIBP; Sputnik Light; Sputnik V; Vaxzevria; Zifivax
Dengue vaccine	Dengue virus	RNA	Dengue fever	Dengvaxia, Qdenga
Ebola vaccine	Ebolavirus	RNA	Ebola	Ervebo; Mvabea; Zabdeno
H1N1 vaccine	H1N1 virus	RNA	Swine flu	Panvax
Hepatitis A vaccine	Hepatitis A virus	RNA	Hepatitis A	Avaxim, Biovac-A, Epaxal, Havrix, VAQTA
Hepatitis B vaccine	Hepatitis B virus	DNA	Hepatitis B	Comvax (bivalent); ComBE Five (pentavalent); Easyfive TT (pentavalent); Elovac B; Engerix-B; Euvax B; Fendrix; Genevac B; Heplisav-B; Pediarix (pentavalent); Pentabio (pentavalent); Pentavac PFS (pentavalent); Prehevbrio; Quinvaxem (pentavalent); Recombivax HB; Sci-B-Vac; Shan-5 (pentavalent); Shanvac B; Vaxelis (hexavalent)
Hepatitis A and B vaccine	Hepatitis A virus and Hepatitis B virus	RNA (A), DNA (B)	Hepatitis A and Hepatitis B	Ambirix, Bilive, Twinrix
Hepatitis E vaccine	Hepatitis E virus	RNA	Hepatitis E	HEV 239 (in-house name, not brand name)
HPV vaccine	Human papillomavirus	DNA	Cervical cancer; Genital warts; anogenital cancers; Oropharyngeal cancer	Cecolin; Cervarix; Gardasil; Walrinvax
Influenza vaccine	Influenza virus	RNA	Influenza	Agriflu, Fluarix, Flubio, FluLaval, FluMist, Fluvirin, Fluzone, Influvac, Pandemrix, Vaxigrip
Japanese encephalitis vaccine	Japanese encephalitis virus	RNA	Japanese encephalitis	Encevac, Imojev, Ixiaro, Jeev, Jenvac, Jespect, JEvax
Junin vaccine	Junin virus	RNA	Argentine hemorrhagic fever	Candid 1
Measles vaccine, MMR vaccine, MMRV vaccine	Measles virus	RNA	Measles	MMR II, Priorix, Priorix Tetra, ProQuad, Tresivac, Trimovax
Mumps vaccine, MMR vaccine, MMRV vaccine	Mumps virus	RNA	Mumps	MMR II, Priorix, Priorix Tetra, ProQuad, Tresivac, Trimovax
Polio vaccine	Polio virus	RNA	Poliomyelitis	Ipol, Kinrix, Pediacel, Pediarix, Pentacel, Quadracel, Vaxelis (hexavalent)
Rabies vaccine	Rabies virus	RNA	Rabies	Abhayrab, Imovax, RabAvert, Rabipur, Rabivax, Speeda, Verovab
Respiratory Syncytial Virus (RSV) vaccine	Respiratory Syncytial virus	RNA	RSV pneumonia	Arexvy, Abrysvo
Rotavirus vaccine	Rotavirus	RNA	Rotaviral gastroenteritis	Rotarix, Rotateq
Rubella vaccine, MMR vaccine, MMRV vaccine	Rubella virus	RNA	Rubella	MMR II, Priorix, ProQuad, Tresivac, Trimovax
Tick-borne encephalitis vaccine	Tick-borne encephalitis virus	RNA	Tick-borne encephalitis	Encepur, EnceVi, FSME-Immun, TBE-Moscow
Varicella vaccine, Shingles vaccine, MMRV vaccine	Varicella zoster virus	DNA	Chickenpox, Shingles	Priorix Tetra, ProQuad, Shingrix, Varilrix, Varivax, Zostavax
Smallpox vaccine	Variola virus	DNA	Smallpox	ACAM2000, Dryvax, Imvanex, Jynneos
Yellow fever vaccine	Yellow fever virus	RNA	Yellow fever	Stamaril, YF-VAX

=== Bacterial diseases ===
List of vaccines for bacterial diseases
Vaccine(s)	Bacterium	Diseases or conditions	Brands
Anthrax vaccines	Bacillus anthracis	Anthrax	BioThrax
Brucella vaccine	Brucella abortus	Brucellosis	RB51
DPT vaccine	Bordetella pertussis	Whooping cough	Boostrix, Adacel, Daptacel, Infanrix, Tripedia, Kinrix, Pediarix, Pentacel, Tetramune, Quinvaxem, Pentavac PFS, Easyfive TT, Shan-5, ComBE Five
DPT vaccine	Clostridium tetani	Tetanus	Boostrix, Adacel, Daptacel, Infanrix, Tripedia, Kinrix, Pediarix, Pentacel, Tetramune, Quinvaxem, Pentavac PFS, Easyfive TT, Shan-5, ComBE Five
DPT vaccine	Corynebacterium diphtheriae	Diphtheria	Boostrix, Adacel, Daptacel, Infanrix, Tripedia, Kinrix, Pediarix, Pentacel, Tetramune, Quinvaxem, Pentavac PFS, Easyfive TT, Shan-5, ComBE Five
DTwP-HepB-Hib vaccine	Corynebacterium diphtheriae	Diphtheria	ComBE Five, Easyfive TT, Pediarix, Pentabio, Pentavac PFS, Quinvaxem, Shan-5, Vaxelis (hexavalent)
DTwP-HepB-Hib vaccine	Clostridium tetani	Tetanus	ComBE Five, Easyfive TT, Pediarix, Pentabio, Pentavac PFS, Quinvaxem, Shan-5, Vaxelis (hexavalent)
DTwP-HepB-Hib vaccine	Bordetella pertussis	Whooping cough	ComBE Five, Easyfive TT, Pediarix, Pentabio, Pentavac PFS, Quinvaxem, Shan-5, Vaxelis (hexavalent)
DTwP-HepB-Hib vaccine	Haemophilus influenzae	(wide range of conditions)	ComBE Five, Easyfive TT, Pediarix, Pentabio, Pentavac PFS, Quinvaxem, Shan-5, Vaxelis (hexavalent)
Q fever vaccine	Coxiella burnetii	Q fever	Q-Vax
H. influenzae vaccine	Haemophilus influenzae	(wide range of conditions)	Comvax (bivalent)
Hib vaccine	Haemophilus influenzae type B (Hib)	Epiglottitis, meningitis, pneumonia	Hiberix, Pentacel, ActHIB, Pedvax HIB, Tetramune, Quinvaxem, Pentavac PFS, Easyfive TT, Shan-5, ComBE Five
Tuberculosis (BCG) vaccine	Mycobacterium tuberculosis	Tuberculosis	Tice BCG
Meningococcal vaccine	Neisseria meningitidis	Meningococcal meningitis	Serotype C: Neisvac C and Meningitec. Serotypes A/C/W-135/Y: Mencevax, Nimenrix, Menveo, Menactra. Serotype B: Bexsero
Typhoid vaccine	Salmonella Typhi	Typhoid fever	Typhim Vi, Typherix, Ty21a
Pneumococcal conjugate vaccine, Pneumococcal polysaccharide vaccine	Streptococcus pneumoniae	Pneumococcal pneumonia	Pneumovax, Prevnar
Cholera vaccine	Vibrio cholerae	Cholera	Dukoral, Shanchol, Vaxchora

=== Parasitic diseases ===
List of vaccines for parasitic diseases
Vaccine(s)	Parasite	Diseases or conditions	Brands
Malaria vaccine	Plasmodium	Malaria	Mosquirix, R21/Matrix-M

=== Vaccines under research ===
==== Viral diseases ====
- Adenovirus vaccine
- Coxsackie B virus vaccine
- Cytomegalovirus vaccine
- Eastern Equine encephalitis virus vaccine for humans
- Enterovirus 71 vaccine
- Epstein–Barr vaccine
- H5N1 vaccine
- Hepatitis C vaccine
- HIV vaccine
- HPLV-3 vaccine
- HTLV-1 T-lymphotropic leukemia vaccine for humans
- HSV vaccine
- Marburg virus disease vaccine
- MERS vaccine
- Nipah virus vaccine
- Norovirus vaccine
- SARS vaccine
- West Nile virus vaccine for humans
- Zika virus vaccine

==== Bacterial diseases ====
- Caries vaccine
- Gonorrhea vaccine
- Ehrlichiosis vaccine
- Helicobacter pylori vaccine
- Leprosy vaccine
- Lyme disease vaccine
- Staphylococcus aureus vaccine
- Streptococcus pyogenes vaccine
- Syphilis vaccine
- Tularemia vaccine
- Plague vaccine

==== Parasitic diseases ====
- Chagas disease vaccine
- Hookworm vaccine
- Leishmaniasis vaccine
- Onchocerciasis river blindness vaccine for humans
- Schistosomiasis vaccine
- Trypanosomiasis vaccine

==== Non-infectious diseases ====
- Alzheimer's disease amyloid protein vaccine
- Breast cancer vaccine
- Ovarian cancer vaccine
- Prostate cancer vaccine
- Talimogene laherparepvec (T-VEC), - Herpes virus engineered to produce immune-boosting molecule

==== Other ====
- Heroin vaccine

=== Vaccine components ===
- Adjuvant
- List of vaccine ingredients
- Preservative
- Thiomersal
- Vaccine types

=== Vaccine trials ===
- Vaccine trial

=== Vaccination strategies ===
- Pulse vaccination strategy
- Ring vaccination
- Cocooning (immunization)

=== Vaccine safety ===
- Adverse effect (medicine)
  - Adverse drug reaction
- Artificial induction of immunity
- Eczema vaccinatum
- Vaccine Adverse Event Reporting System
- Vaccine injury
- Vaccine Safety Datalink

== People ==
=== Developers of vaccines ===
- Leila Denmark
- Grace Eldering
- John Franklin Enders
- Thomas Francis, Jr.
- Ian Frazer
- Sarah Gilbert
- Loney Gordon
- Leonard Hayflick
- Maurice Hilleman
- Edward Jenner
- Pearl Kendrick
- Hilary Koprowski
- Marshall Lightowlers
- Paul Offit
- Louis Pasteur
- Stanley Plotkin
- Albert Sabin
- Jonas Salk
- Max Theiler
- Pablo DT Valenzuela
- Jian Zhou

== Organizations, conferences and publications ==
Manufacturers

- AstraZeneca
  - MedImmune (former; supplanted by AstraZeneca)
- Bharat Biotech
- BioMérieux
- BioNTech
- CSL Limited
- Eli Lilly
- Emergent BioSolutions
- GSK plc
- HIPRA
- Janssen Vaccines (formerly Crucell; a Johnson & Johnson unit)
- MassBiologics (part of UMass Chan Medical School)
- Merck & Co.
  - Schering-Plough (former; now a part of Merck & Co.)
- Moderna
- Novartis
- Pfizer
- Sanofi Pasteur (a Sanofi-Aventis unit)
- Serum Institute of India
- Sinopharm
- Sinovac Biotech
- Teva Pharmaceuticals
- Valneva SE

Publications

- Nature Reviews Immunology
- Nature Reviews Microbiology

Other

- 2000 Simpsonwood CDC conference
- American Academy of Pediatrics
- Coalition for Epidemic Preparedness Innovations
- Council of State and Territorial Epidemiologists
- Emory National Primate Research Center
- Expanded Program on Immunization (Philippines)
- Gavi, the Vaccine Alliance
- Immunization Alliance
- International AIDS Vaccine Initiative
- Israel Institute for Biological Research
- Jenner Institute
- March of Dimes
- National Center for Immunization and Respiratory Diseases
- National Immunization Technical Advisory Group (NITAG)
  - Advisory Committee on Immunization Practices
  - Australian Technical Advisory Group on Immunisation
  - Joint Committee on Vaccination and Immunisation
  - National Advisory Committee on Immunization
  - National Immunisation Advisory Committee
  - Standing Committee on Vaccination
- Pasteur Institute
- Rotary International
- Sabin Vaccine Institute
- Strategic Advisory Group of Experts
- Uganda Virus Research Institute
- UNICEF
- Vaccinate Your Family
- Vaccination Week In The Americas
- World Immunization Week

Advocacy of anti-vaccination opinions

- Australian Vaccination-risks Network
- Children's Health Defense
- Generation Rescue (2005-2019)
- Informed Consent Action Network
- National Vaccine Information Center
- SafeMinds (mentioned in Thiomersal and vaccines)
- National League for Liberty in Vaccination (France)
- Vaccine Choice Canada
- Freedom Angels Foundation
- Learn the Risk

== Films supporting vaccination ==
- Virulent: The Vaccine War

== Legal aspects ==
- Project Bioshield Act
- Biodefense and Pandemic Vaccine and Drug Development Act of 2005
- National Childhood Vaccine Injury Act
- Public Readiness and Emergency Preparedness Act
- Vaccine court
- Vaccines for the New Millennium Act

== Other ==
- 2001 United Kingdom foot-and-mouth crisis
- Active immunization
- AIDS origins opposed to scientific consensus
- Anti-vaccine activism
- Anti-vaccine activism in Canada
- Antibiotic resistance
- Antiviral drug
- BCG disease outbreak in Finland in the 2000s
- Bioterrorism
- Clostridium vaccine
- Controversies in autism
- Death rates in the 20th century
- Efficacy
- Fill and finish
- Flying syringe
- Gamma globulin
- Genetic engineering
- Genetics
- Herd immunity
- History of medicine
- History of science
- Original antigenic sin
- Host (biology)
- Immortality
- Immunization
- Immunology
- Immunostimulant
- Inoculation
- Intramuscular injection
- Jehovah's Witnesses and blood transfusions
- Lipid A
- Live virus reference strain
- Molecular virology
- Naked DNA
- Nobel Prize in Physiology or Medicine
- Number needed to vaccinate
- OPV AIDS hypothesis
- Pet passport
- Pharmacology
- Poliomyelitis eradication
- Post-exposure prophylaxis
- Precautionary principle
- Pregnancy
- Prophylaxis
- Public health
- Quarantine
- Recombinant DNA
- Science and technology in the United States
- Strategic National Stockpile
- Superantigen
- Thiomersal and vaccines
- Timeline of vaccines
- Toxoid
- Travel medicine
- United States and weapons of mass destruction
- Vaccination
- Vaccination policy
- Vaccination schedule
- Vaccinator
- Vaccine
- Vaccine controversies
- Vaccine line jumping
- Vaccine wastage
- Vaccine-induced seropositivity
- Viral shift
- Virology
- Virus-like particle
- World AIDS Vaccine Day

== See also ==
- Indian states ranking by vaccination coverage
- List of infectious diseases
