= Vaccine wastage =

Vaccines not administered in an immunization program

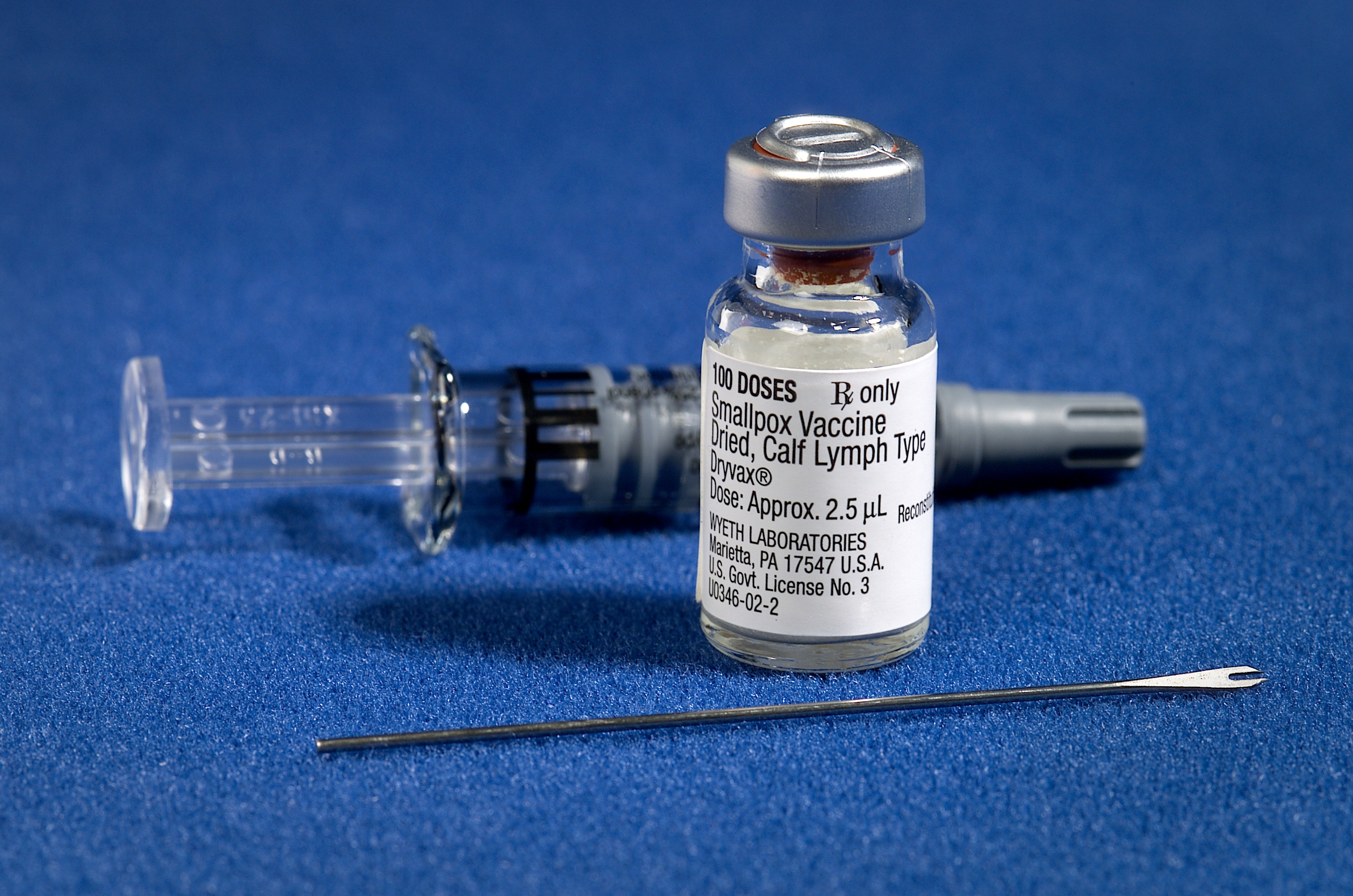
Components of a smallpox vaccination kit

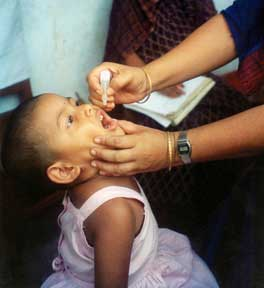
Oral polio vaccine

Vaccine wastage is the number of vaccines that have not been administered during vaccine deployment in an immunization program. The wastage can occur at multiple stages of the deployment process, and can take place in both unopened and opened vials, or in oral admission. It is an expected part of vaccination deployment and is factored into the manufacturing process.

== Prevalence ==
A 2018 study into Cambodia's national immunization program found wastage rates of 0% to 60% depending on location and vaccination type.

A study from India which collected Universal Immunisation Programme data from two different locations (Kangra and Pune districts) between January 2016 to December 2017 found wastage rates that differed according to vaccine type, reuse type, vial size, transition from IPV (inactivated polio vaccine) dosage to fIPV (fractional inactivated polio vaccine) and according to the geographical location. In both districts wastage increased as vial size increased from 5 to 10 dose vials. In Kangra, wastage observed in oral polio vaccine was 50.8% while in Pune it was 14.3%. Wastage for a number of other vaccinations in the program was higher than what had been factored into the initial programme forecasting.

Parts of the United States has vaccine wastage tracking factored into the deployment process. Reasons for vaccine wastage are categorised as— broken vial/syringe, lost or unaccounted for, open but not all doses administered, or drawn into a syringe but not administered. Other reasons for wastage include contamination, expiration and temperature issues. Vaccine wastage in the United States during its 2021 COVID-19 vaccination program is less than 1%, and reported as low as 0.1%. In India covid vaccine wastage was 6.5% while in Scotland and Wales it was 1.8%.

== Reduction ==
Improving requirement estimates, transportation and logistics, wastage reporting, optimal session sizes and usage of syringes and needles with low dead volume are important factors in reducing wastage. While manufacturing single dose vials would considerably reduce vaccine wastage, it would increase the cost of the manufacturing process. However there are cases when single dose vials are optimum such as when administering vaccines to a limited number of people or single person sessions.

== See also ==
- Vaccine
- Vaccinator
- Vaccine cooler
- Vaccination
- Vaccine hesitancy
