= Project Bioshield =

US law

Project BioShield Act of 2004
- Long title: An Act To amend the Public Health Service Act to provide protections and countermeasures against chemical, radiological, or nuclear agents that may be used in a terrorist attack against the United States by giving the National Institutes of Health contracting flexibility, infrastructure improvements, and expediting the scientific peer review process, and streamlining the Food and Drug Administration approval process of countermeasures
- Enacted by: the 108th United States Congress

Citations
- Public law: 108-276
- Statutes at Large: 118 Stat. 835–864

Codification
- Titles amended: 42: Public Health and Social Welfare
- U.S.C. sections amended: Chapter 6A § 201

Legislative history
- Introduced in the Senate as S. 15 by Judd Gregg (R-NH) on March 11, 2003; Committee consideration by Senate HELP; Passed the Senate on May 19, 2004 (99-0); Passed the House on July 14, 2004 (414–2); Signed into law by President George W. Bush on July 21, 2004

Project Bioshield, formally known as the Project Bioshield Act was enacted by the United States Congress in 2004 calling for $5 billion for purchasing vaccines that would be used in the event of a bioterrorist attack. This was a ten-year program to acquire medical countermeasures to chemical, biological, radiological, and nuclear agents for civilian use. A key element of the Act was to allow stockpiling and distribution of vaccines which had not been tested for safety or efficacy in humans, due to ethical concerns. Efficacy of such agents cannot be directly tested in humans without also exposing humans to the chemical, biological, or radioactive threat being treated, so testing follows the "FDA Animal Rule" for pivotal animal efficacy.

Since the 2001 terrorist attacks, the United States government has allocated nearly $50 billion to address the threat of biological weapons. U.S. funding for bioweapons-related activities focuses primarily on research for and acquisition of medicines for defense. Funding also goes toward stockpiling protective equipment, increased surveillance and detection of biological agents, and improving state and hospital preparedness. The increase in this type of funding is mainly for Project BioShield. Significant funding also goes to Biomedical Advanced Research and Development Authority (BARDA), part of Department of Health and Human Services (HHS). Funding for activities aimed at prevention has more than doubled 2007 and is distributed to 11 federal agencies. Efforts toward cooperative international action are part of the project.

== Provisions ==
- Amends the Public Health Service Act to authorize the Secretary of Health and Human Services (HHS) to: (1) conduct and support research and development activities for countermeasures in biological emergencies and provide that biocontaminant laboratories and specialized research facilities will be available to the Secretary to respond to public health emergencies affecting national security.
- Allows the Secretary to expedite purchasing related to research and development needs by simplifying limits on procurement.
- Allows the Secretary to respond to pressing research and development needs, including expediting peer review, contracting with experts, and appointing employees to positions at the National Institutes of Health.
- Amends the Public Health Service Act to allow the Director of the NIH to act through the Director of the National Institute of Allergy and Infectious Diseases (NIAID) to provide grants for the modernization and construction of research facilities. Increases the Federal share of such NIAID-funded projects.
- Provides funding for the National Vaccine Program for FY 2004 and 2005.
- Adds the Secretary of Homeland Security (DHS) to the working group on the prevention, preparedness, and response to bioterrorism and other public health emergencies.
- Amends the Public Health Security and Bioterrorism Preparedness and Response Act of 2002 to direct the Secretary to coordinate with Homeland Security to maintain the Strategic National Stockpile and deploy the Stockpile to respond to an emergency.
- Allows security countermeasures to be procured using the special reserve fund (an appropriations account set up by to this Act). A "security countermeasure" is a countermeasure that is either authorized for emergency use or that the Secretary determines is a priority, is necessary, and is an approved drug or a drug reasonably likely to be approved within eight years.
- Provides that in order for a countermeasure to be procured using the special reserve fund: (1) HHS must identify a chemical, biological, radiological or nuclear agent as a threat to the U.S. population that may affect national security; (2) HHS must determine that a countermeasure is necessary to protect public health; (3) HHS must assess the availability and appropriateness of the countermeasure to address the threat; (4) DHS and HHS must jointly submit a proposal to the president to issue a call for the development of countermeasures that are not available or cleared only for alternative purposes; (5) DHS and HHS must make a commitment to recommend that the special reserve fund be available for the procurement of a countermeasure; (6) the President must approve the proposal; (7) DHS and HHS must make specified information known to those who may respond to a call for the countermeasure including the specifications of the needed countermeasure; (8) HHS must determine which countermeasures can be procured using the special reserve fund; (9) the HHS and DHS and the Director of the Office of Management Budget must submit a recommendation to the President that the special reserve fund be used to procure the countermeasure; and (10) the President must approve the recommendation. HHS and DHS must notify designated congressional committees promptly that a material threat has been identified and countermeasures are necessary to protect the public health and that the President has approved a recommendation for countermeasure procurement using the special reserve fund. Authorizes appropriations for the special reserve fund to procure security countermeasures approved by the President, for the hiring of personnel to carry out terror threat assessments, and for the development of secure intelligence-sharing facilities. Transfers the functions, personnel, assets, unexpended balances, and liabilities of the Stockpile from the Secretary of Homeland Security to the Secretary of Health and Human Services.
- Amends the Homeland Security Act to change the responsibilities of the Secretary of Homeland Security as they relate to the Stockpile.
- Amends the Federal Food, Drug, and Cosmetic Act to allow the Secretary to authorize the use of a drug, device, or biological product intended for emergency use, specifically allowing the use of unapproved products, or the unapproved use of approved products, upon a determination by DHS that there is or is a significant potential for a domestic emergency, or upon a determination by DHS of a public health emergency that affects or may affect national security and that involves a specified agent or a specified disease that may be attributable to such agent. Amends the National Defense Authorization Act to continue provisions governing the emergency use of products with respect to members of the Armed Forces. The Secretary can authorize the use of unapproved products in an emergency only upon a determination by the Secretary of Defense of a military emergency involving a heightened risk to U.S. forces of an attack.
- Requires the Comptroller General to: (1) review the Secretary's use of the authorities granted under this Act; (2) assess the adequacy of the internal controls instituted by the Secretary; (3) identify any procurements that would have been significantly delayed or not made without the authorities provided to the Secretary; (4) determine to what extent authorized activities under this Act have enhanced the development of biomedical countermeasures; (5) assess the availability of countermeasures to address threats; (6) assess the extent to which programs and activities will reduce a gap between the threat and the availability of countermeasures to an acceptable level of risk; and (7) assess the threats to national security posed by technology that will enable the development of antibiotic-resistant, mutated, or bioengineered strains of biological agents and recommend strategies for addressing such threats, and make recommendations on possible improvements.
- Directs the Secretary, the Secretary of Homeland Security, and the Secretary of Defense to ensure that the activities of their respective Departments coordinate, complement, and do not unnecessarily duplicate programs designed to protect the homeland from biological, chemical, radiological, and nuclear agents. Directs such Secretaries to each appoint an official to coordinate such programs for their respective Departments.

== Act accomplishments ==
Progress has been made, in the establishment of both national requirements and acquisition strategies, as well as the procurement of pre- and post-exposure countermeasures to meet the threat from anthrax, botulinum toxins, smallpox, and radiological and nuclear threats.

United States Department of Health and Human Services (HHS) has taken a number of additional steps to accomplish the goal of effectively and efficiently implementing the Project BioShield Act. HHS has reorganized the Assistant Secretary for Preparedness and Response (ASPR) (formerly the Office of Public Health Emergency Preparedness) and established a dedicated strategic planning function that more efficiently integrates biodefense requirements and streamlines the interagency governance process. Under the reorganized structure, on behalf of the secretary of HHS, the ASPR leads the federal public health and medical response to acts of terrorism or nature and other public health and medical emergencies. In 2006, HHS announced, in the Federal Register Notice of 6 July 2006, the establishment of the Public Health Emergency Medical Countermeasures Enterprise (PHEMCE).

== Acquired vaccines ==
In September 2012 BioPrepWatch reported that the BARDA annual report shows that the number of supplies of countermeasures for combating terrorist attacks is growing.

According to the report, BARDA has acquired:

- 107,000 doses of an antitoxin for Clostridium botulinum (a decrease from the full 200,000 doses ordered in 2006).
- 57,102 doses of the monoclonal antibody Raxibacumab, which treats anthrax, from Human Genome Sciences in 2011. This included 20,000 doses under a 2005 contact and 37,102 doses of the 45,000 ordered in a 2009 contract option. At the end of 2010, there was a total supply of 36,102 doses of Raxibacumab.
- 10,000 doses of anthrax immune globulin from Cangene, which also treats anthrax. By 2010, the supply was down to 7,327 doses, with spending on Raxibacumab and AIG coming to $478 million.
- 28.75 million doses of the anthrax vaccine BioThrax from Emergent BioSolutions.
- Botulism treatments, as well, including 107,560 doses of Botulinum Antitoxin Therapeutic from Cangene. It ordered 200,000 doses. At the end of 2010, the supply was at 97,000 doses.

== Related legislation ==
Section 401 of the Pandemic and All-Hazards Preparedness Reauthorization Act of 2013 (H.R. 307; 113th Congress) reauthorized the BioShield Project. More specifically, it reauthorizes the Project BioShield Special Reserve Fund (SRF), originally established in 2004.

== Developments 2013-2018 ==
To June 2013, eight medical countermeasures (MCM) against anthrax, smallpox, botulinum toxin and radiological threats have been procured. Eighty other candidate MCMs are undergoing advanced development. The authorities and funds contained in the Project BioShield Act were slated to expire at the end of year 2013. The legislative experiment of BioShield was subject to evaluation and reconsideration in the House and the Senate, which both passed versions of reauthorization legislation.

In March 2013 funding was extended through 2018 via the Pandemic Act."Pandemic and All-Hazards Preparedness Reauthorization Act". US Department of Health and Human Services. March 2013.

In February 2018 the Bipartisan Policy Center released a report called "Budgeting for Medical Countermeasures: An Ongoing Need for Preparedness." Based on the report, former U.S. Senator Tom Daschle (D-SD) said that the change in the way that the Project BioShield Act of 2004 is funded (it changed from a ten-year appropriations cycle to year-by-year funding) creates a climate of uncertainty for private firms looking to invest in medical countermeasures (MCM) against chemical, biological, radiological or nuclear (CBRN) agents. No commercial market exists for MCMs, so the firms that research and develop MCMs have to depend on a reliable stream of government money. According to Homeland Preparedness News, "Daschle and [former U.S. Sen. Judd] Gregg offered budgeting strategies that they believe could lend stability to the MCM arena, some of which would call for changes to statutory processes and congressional procedures that have been implemented since the Project BioShield Act's 2004 enactment."

== Published literature ==
A 2005 review reported that the project had an advanced appropriation for countermeasures—ranging from vaccines to biodosimetry to surveillance—related to biological weapons and other WMD. Provisions have been made as well to ensure safer and more effective vaccinations for such threats such as smallpox. Another issue lies within the US Food and Drug Administration (FDA). The FDA requires clinical studies of human safety and efficacy. The Journal of the American Osteopathic Association notes that this kind of testing for biological weapons is ethically unacceptable to conduct on humans. "The need for expedited development of critical countermeasures must be balanced against the need to ensure that these essential interventions are safe as well as effective."

A 2007 review stated that the project is needed because when the only market is the government, there is a high risk of failure and a low expectation of profit. This discourages other manufacturers from investing research, development and funds in the bioterrorism products to be sold, because the expected profits do not justify the opportunity costs. Pharmaceutical and vaccine manufacturers can perceive the federal government as an uncertain and low-profit market. The project was developed in an attempt to provide a financial incentive to manufacturers to develop the products needed for defense against CBRN threats.

A perspective piece published in The New England Journal of Medicine in 2009 noted that the FDA issued Emergency Use Authorization (EUA) to use an unapproved drug in case of an emergency, but also noted that this could only issued only after the secretary of health and human services has declared a public health emergency. "In the case of the 2009 H1N1 influenza pandemic, such a declaration was made on April 26, 2009. An EUA for a medical product has a term of one year, but it can be renewed, depending on the circumstances of the emergency. It is important that product development continue to focus on the goal of approval (there are ongoing clinical trials evaluating the efficacy of intravenous peramivir in treating influenza), because the EUA is only a temporary means for making a product available during an emergency."

A book published in 2010 stated that the project allows the Secretary of Health and Human Services to purchase unapproved and unlicensed vaccinations. The HHS will determine that "...sufficient and satisfactory clinical experience or research data...support(s) a reasonable conclusion that the product will qualify for approval or licensing...within eight years." The HHS will write contracts on these unapproved products, help lowering the purchasing cost of the drugs.

== Challenges and criticism ==
Some provisions of Project BioShield are controversial. Some critics suggest that biotechnology and pharmaceutical companies will require even more incentives than contained in these proposals from the Government.

The project's funding would be subject to annual review through the appropriations process. Furthermore, the law would require the HHS Secretary to prepare annual reports detailing actions taken under this Act including identification of each person or entity that received, or was considered and rejected for grants, cooperative agreements, or contracts under this Act.

The approval and licensing processes are designed to preclude the marketing of ineffective and dangerous treatments. Only about 20% of drugs that begin the approval process actually become approved treatments. Because it is not possible to predict the outcome of the approval process, critics of this provision suggest that the government will end up purchasing countermeasures that will eventually fail to be approved.

Obstacles to pharmaceutical and vaccine development include inadequate funding for research, insufficient protections against corporate liability, and constraints related to safety considerations. Typically, the drug-development process in the United States is largely initiated by the National Institutes of Health, which supports basic research through funding scientists. Although the development of a new medication usually takes several years between the time that research begins to the time that the medication is marketed, developing medical interventions against potential biological weapons is especially intense in terms of time, labor, and finances. There is also no guarantee that the drug companies will purchase the vaccinations.

=== Biosafety risks ===
The Bush administration's increased funding for biodefense research led to a large increase in the number of researchers and laboratories handling dangerous pathogens.

A 2008 ProPublica investigation found that the U.S. government's post-9/11 biodefense initiatives led to $48 billion in spending and a dramatic expansion of high-security labs. Critics argue this increase in research facilities and personnel handling deadly pathogens inadvertently heightened national security risks rather than reducing them. Reports found widespread safety lapses, weak oversight, and even cases of insider threats, such as the 2001 anthrax attacks, which were ultimately linked to a government scientist. In The Bulletin of Atomic Scientists, Nick Schwellenbach wrote that the majority of new researchers receiving biodefense grants had no prior experience with such pathogens, increasing the risk of mishandling or exposure incidents.

=== PhRMA ===
In 2005 the chief medical officer for biomedical preparedness at the Pharmaceutical Research and Manufacturers of America in Washington DC voiced additional financial concerns of the pharmaceutical industry. Michael Friedman MD explains that manufacturers of biological defense products could still be "exposed to devastating product-liability suits," adding, "The decision to divert resources from the research and development of medicines for serious illnesses like heart disease can be financially risky, especially when a countermeasure may never be purchased or used." Friedman argues there needs to be more sponsored research and collaborative programs that engage government, academia, and industry, as well as additional incentives for private companies.

== See also ==
- Biodefense and Pandemic Vaccine and Drug Development Act of 2005, nicknamed "Bioshield Two"
- Biomedical Advanced Research and Development Authority (BARDA)
- Vaccines for the New Millennium Act
- Pandemic and All-Hazards Preparedness Reauthorization Act of 2013 (H.R. 307; 113th Congress)
