= Biodefense and Pandemic Vaccine and Drug Development Act of 2005 =

The Biodefense and Pandemic Vaccine and Drug Development Act of 2005 (S. 1873), nicknamed "Bioshield Two" and sponsored by Senator Richard Burr (R-North Carolina), aimed to shorten the pharmaceutical development process for new vaccines and drugs in case of a pandemic, and to protect vaccine makers and the pharmaceutical industry from legal liability for vaccine injuries. A key provision of the proposed bill was the establishment of a new federal agency, the Biomedical Advanced Research and Development Agency (BARDA), that would serve as the central authority to promote advanced research and development of drugs and vaccines in response to bioterrorism and natural disease outbreaks. The bill also proposed shielding the agency from public Freedom of Information Act (FOIA) requests, which would protect it from long-standing open records and meetings laws.

The bill, co-sponsored by Bill Frist (R-TN), Mike Enzi (R-WY), Judd Gregg (R-NH), and Lamar Alexander (R-TN), was approved by the Senate Health, Education, Labor, and Pensions Committee through voice vote. However, it faced opposition from Democrats who raised concerns about transparency, accountability, and national security. Ultimately, the bill did not pass in its original form. Many of its provisions, however, were later incorporated into the Biodefense and Pandemic Vaccine and Drug Development Act of 2005, and later, the Pandemic and All-Hazards Preparedness Act of 2006.

== Key Provisions ==
The Bioshield Two bill would shift the main responsibility for developing bioterrorism countermeasures out of the Department of Homeland Security and into the new BARDA agency within the Department of Health and Human Services. The proposed new agency would improve on Project BioShield, a barely two-year-old program also meant to encourage the production of vaccines and drugs.

BARDA would receive a first-year budget of $1 billion. Other key aspects of the proposed legislation included:

1. Establishment of BARDA: The act proposed the creation of the Biomedical Advanced Research and Development Agency (BARDA) within the Department of Health and Human Services (HHS). BARDA would lead the development of countermeasures against bioterrorism and natural disease outbreaks.
2. Funding: BARDA was allocated a first-year budget of $1 billion to support research and development.
3. Liability Protections: The act included provisions to protect manufacturers, distributors, and healthcare providers from liability related to the administration of vaccines and drugs developed under BARDA.
4. Incentives for Domestic Manufacturing: The act provided rebates and grants to encourage domestic production of vaccines and medical countermeasures.
5. Transparency and Accountability: The act faced opposition due to concerns about transparency and accountability, particularly regarding exemptions from Freedom of Information Act (FOIA) requests.

== Legislative History ==
The bill was approved by the Senate Health, Education, Labor, and Pensions Committee but faced opposition from Democrats. Despite not passing in its original form, many provisions were later incorporated into the Pandemic and All-Hazards Preparedness Act of 2006.

=== Updates and Current Status ===
Since its inception, BARDA has played a crucial role in responding to various public health emergencies, including the COVID-19 pandemic. BARDA continues to support the development of vaccines, antiviral drugs, and other medical countermeasures.

=== Recent Statistics ===
1. Vaccine Uptake Rates: As of 2022, the National Biodefense Strategy aims to increase vaccine uptake rates to over 85% through evidence-based public messaging and education campaigns [1].
2. Pathogen-Specific Tests: The strategy includes developing and deploying pathogen-specific tests within 30 days [1].
3. Diagnostics: Producing rapid, low-cost, point-of-need diagnostics within 90 days [1].
4. Therapeutics: Repurposing effective therapeutics within 90 days [1].
5. Clinical Trials: Maintaining clinical trial infrastructure to launch new trials within 14 days of medical countermeasure identification [1].

=== Support and Opposition ===
Support: Proponents argued that the act would create a partnership between the federal government, pharmaceutical industry, and academia to streamline the development process and safeguard national security.

Opposition: Critics raised concerns about the lack of compensation for individuals injured by vaccines or drugs, which could discourage first responders and patients from using these countermeasures.

== See also ==
- Pandemic and All-Hazards Preparedness Act − (Pub. L. 109–417 (text) (PDF)), a similar bill
- Public Readiness and Emergency Preparedness Act, a similar bill
- List of vaccine topics
