= Live virus reference strain =

Live virus reference strain (LVRS) refers to a common strain of a virus that is selected for the manufacture of a preventative vaccine. It is most commonly used in reference to the seasonal Influenza vaccines developed by the Centers for Disease Control every year. However, it can also refer to other virus strains.

== Annual Influenza vaccine development ==
Each year, with the assistance of the World Health Organization, the Centers for Disease Control in Atlanta, Georgia, select strains of Influenza virus that are most likely to provide effective immunization to a broad spectrum of individuals.

Vaccine viruses are chosen to maximize the likelihood that the vaccine will protect against the viruses most likely to spread and cause illness among people during the upcoming flu season. WHO recommends specific vaccine viruses for influenza vaccine production, but then individual countries make their own decisions for licensing of vaccines in their country. In the United States, the Food and Drug Administration determines what viruses will be used in U.S.-licensed vaccines.

== See also ==
- Immunotherapy
- List of vaccine ingredients
- List of vaccine topics
- Virosome
