= Vaccinator =

Medical care occupation

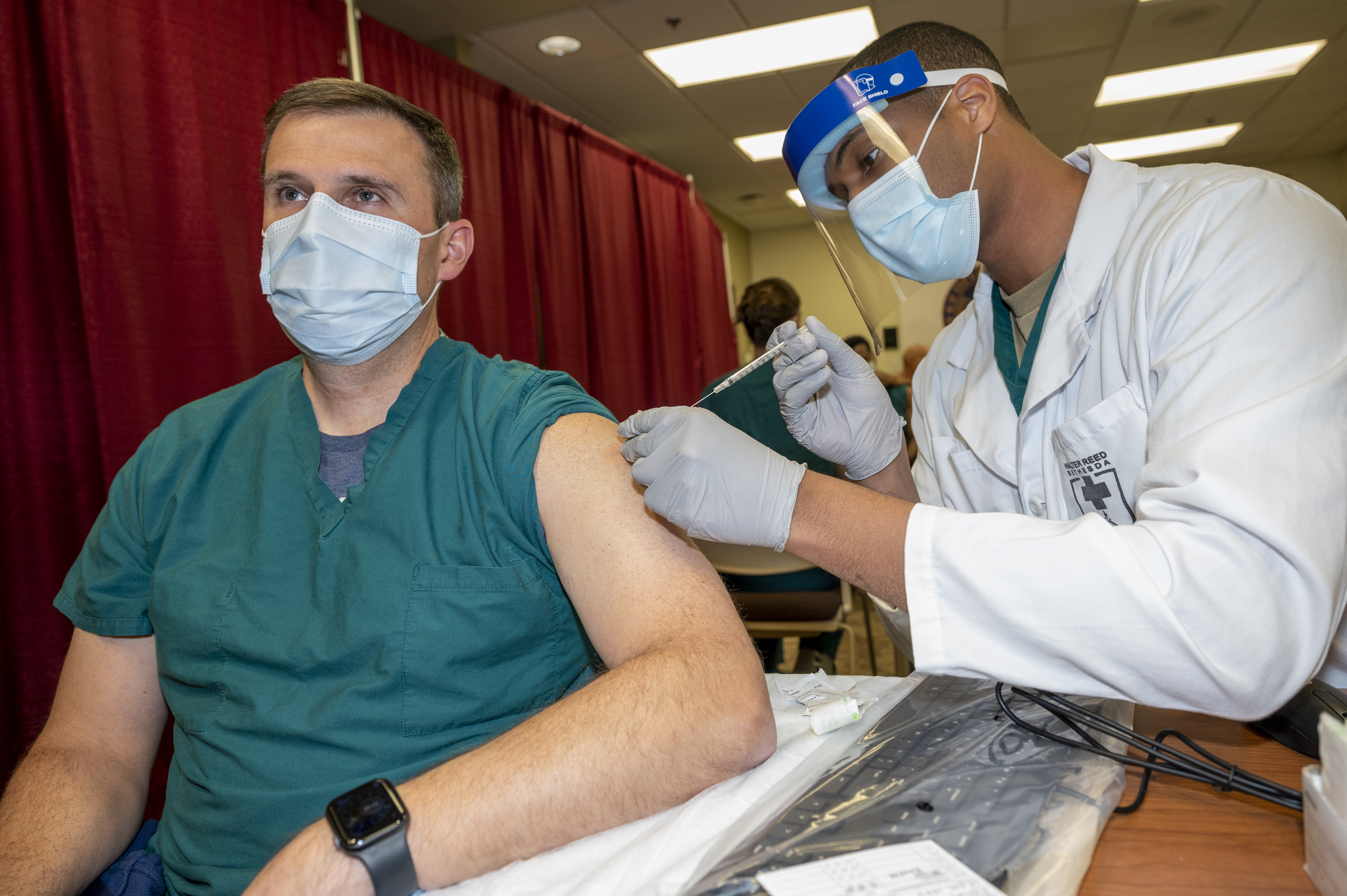
A vaccinator administering a COVID-19 vaccine

A vaccinator is a person who gives injections of a vaccine to people. Vaccinators require the skills of knowing where to inject the needle into the recipient as well as preparing the substance to be injected.

Under normal conditions, routine inoculations can be given by one’s healthcare provider, at a pharmacy, or at special clinics set up in a community. But when a mass vaccination effort is being undertaken, such as during a pandemic, people of various qualifying occupations may be sought specifically for the role as vaccinators due to high demand. Some of them may work full time at the job; others could do so part time in addition to their regular occupation. Some retirees may also work part-time.

== Training ==
Training to be a vaccinator does not only require the skills to give an injection. Training is also needed in the storage and preparation of the materials used to give the shots of varying brands, which have differing requirements. Anaphylaxis training is a part of vaccinator training in some places.

== Qualifying occupations ==
The following are some of the occupations that qualify a person to work as a vaccinator, which vary by location:

- Dentist
- Medical assistant
- Medical student
- National guard
- Nurse
- Nursing student
- Paramedic
- Pharmacist
- Physician
- Physician assistant
- Veterinarian
- Veterinary assistant

== See also ==
- Vaccination
- Vaccine
- List of vaccine topics
