= DPT-Hib vaccine =

Combination vaccine

Combination of
- Diphtheria vaccine: Vaccine
- Tetanus vaccine: Vaccine
- Pertussis vaccine: Vaccine
- Hib vaccine: Vaccine

Clinical data
- Trade names: Tetramune
- AHFS/Drugs.com: Micromedex Detailed Consumer Information
- Routes of administration: Intramuscular injection
- ATC code: J07AG52 (WHO)

DPT-Hib vaccine is a combination vaccine whose generic name is diphtheria and tetanus toxoids and whole-cell pertussis vaccine adsorbed with Hib conjugate vaccine, sometimes abbreviated to DPT-Hib. It protects against the infectious diseases diphtheria, tetanus, pertussis, and Haemophilus influenzae type B.

A branded formulation was marketed in the US as Tetramune by Lederle Praxis Biologicals (subsequently acquired by Wyeth). Tetramune has since been discontinued.
