= List of states and union territories of India by vaccination coverage =

This is a list of the Indian states and territories ranked in order of percentage of children between 12–23 months of age who received all recommended vaccines, including all required doses of the BCG vaccine, Hepatitis B vaccine, polio vaccine, DPT vaccine, and the MMR vaccine. This information was compiled from National Family Health Survey - 4 and 5 published by International Institute for Population Sciences. Overall vaccination coverage in the country increased from 62.0% in 2015-16 to 76.6% in 2019-21 (Urban: 63.9% to 75.5%; Rural: 61.3% to 77.0%).

== List ==
		Vaccination Coverage (%)				Change	
		2015-16			2019-21		
Rank	State	Urban	Rural	Total	Total	Rank	Coverage (%)
1	Odisha	75	79.2	78.6	90.7	▲5	▲12.1
2	Tamil Nadu	73.3	66.8	69.7	89.4	▲8	▲19.7
3	Himachal Pradesh	64.8	69.9	69.5	89.2	▲9	▲19.7
4	West Bengal	77.4	87.1	84.4	88.2	▼1	▲3.8
5	Jammu and Kashmir	81.6	72.9	75.1	86.2	▲3	▲11.1
6	Karnataka	59.8	64.8	62.6	84.3	▲8	▲21.7
7	Sikkim	81.4	83.7	83	82.5	▼3	▼0.5
8	Goa	87.7	90.1	88.4	81.9	▼6	▼6.5
9	Uttarakhand	56.5	58.2	57.7	81.1	▲10	▲23.4
10	Rajasthan	60.9	53.1	54.8	80.5	▲12	▲25.7
11	Chhattisgarh	84.9	74.3	76.4	79.7	▼4	▲3.3
12	Telangana	67.8	68.3	68.1	79.1	▼1	▲10.0
13	Kerala	82.2	82	82.1	78.4	▼8	▼3.7
14	Madhya Pradesh	63	50.2	53.6	77.4	▲9	▲23.8
15	Haryana	57	65.1	62.2	76.9	0	▲14.7
16	Gujarat	50.4	50.4	50.4	76.4	▲9	▲26.0
17	Punjab	88.7	89.3	89.1	76.2	▼16	▼12.9
18	Jharkhand	67	60.7	61.9	74.1	▼2	▲12.2
19	Maharashtra	55.8	56.7	56.3	73.6	▲1	▲17.3
20	Andhra Pradesh	60.4	67.2	65.3	73.2	▼7	▲7.9
21	Mizoram	49.8	51.3	50.3	72.7	▲5	▲22.4
22	Bihar	59.7	61.9	61.7	71.0	▼5	▲9.3
23	Tripura	64.2	51.2	54.5	69.5	▼2	▲15.0
24	Uttar Pradesh	53.6	50.4	51.1	69.9	0	▲18.8
25	Manipur	74.3	61.7	65.8	68.8	▼13	▲3.0
26	Assam	70.9	44.4	47.1	66.7	▲1	▲19.6
27	Arunachal Pradesh	44.2	36.4	38.2	64.9	▲1	▲26.7
28	Meghalaya	81.4	58.5	61.5	64.0	▼10	▲2.5
29	Nagaland	41.6	33.4	35.7	57.9	0	▲22.2

== Union Territory by vaccination coverage ==
		Vaccination Coverage (%)				Change	
		2015-16			2019-21		
Rank	Union Territory	Urban	Rural	Total	Total	Rank	Coverage (%)
1	Dadra and Nagar Haveli	-	35.1	43.2	94.9	▲6	▲22.4
1	Daman and Diu	67.8	62.4	66.3	94.9	▲5	▲28.6
2	Lakshadweep	86.1	-	89.0	86.1	0	▼2.9
3	Puducherry	94.2	85.4	91.4	82.3	▼2	▼9.1
4	Chandigarh	77.2	-	79.5	80.9	▼1	▲1.9
5	Andaman and Nicobar	61.8	82.5	73.2	79.9	▼1	▲6.7
6	Delhi	68.6	-	68.8	76.0	▼2	▲7.2
