= Vaccine line jumping =

Obtaining a vaccine ahead of higher priority individuals

Vaccine line jumping is the act of obtaining a vaccine in which the supply fails to meet the demands of the population ahead of those for whom it has been prioritized, usually via fraudulent means, the exploitation of one's social status, or some other unethical manner. Vaccine line jumping is distinct from vaccine chasing, in which a person goes out of their way to seek a scarcely available vaccine to which they are legally entitled.

In some situations, an honor system is used in which the recipient declares, either verbally or in writing, if they are in a priority group, but no proof is asked. Other places require that one who is in a priority group provide documentation of belonging to such a group. For example, if prioritization is by age, a driver's license or other governmental identification can be used to verify age. If by occupation, a work ID can be used, and if a medical condition is a criterion, it could be a physician certificate.

== Methods ==
Vaccine line jumpers sometimes exaggerate a factor that could include them in a priority group, such as a category of employment or medical condition. For example, a medical administrative worker who has no contact with patients might consider themselves a "healthcare worker", or one who has had a bout of pneumonia might classify themselves as having had "lung disease", even as their condition is not chronic.

Sometimes, a glitch in the registration system can enable those who do not belong to a priority group to register and obtain a shot. Some people can obtain shots ahead of what is considered to be their turn because of their wealth or connections.
