= Vaccines for the New Millennium Act =

Vaccines for the New Millennium Act was introduced by Senator John Kerry (D-MA) and Rep. Nancy Pelosi (D-CA) in the 107th Congress 2001. The bill would have provided tax credits to private sector companies working on vaccines for some of the world's most deadly infectious agents. The tax credits took the form of a 30 percent credit on qualified research and development expenditures related to diseases, including HIV, tuberculosis, and malaria. This legislation's chief Congressional staff assistants were James Matthew Jones for Senator Kerry and Chris Collins for Representative Pelosi. On April 25, 2001, the bill was referred to the Subcommittee on Health, and no further action was taken.
