= Vaccination schedule =

Series of vaccinations

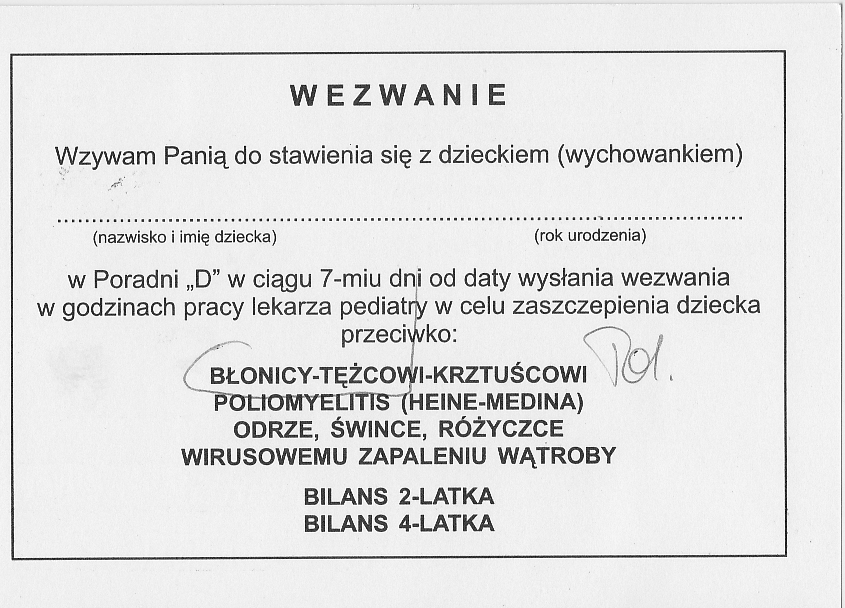
Example Polish call for vaccination against diphtheria and tetanus

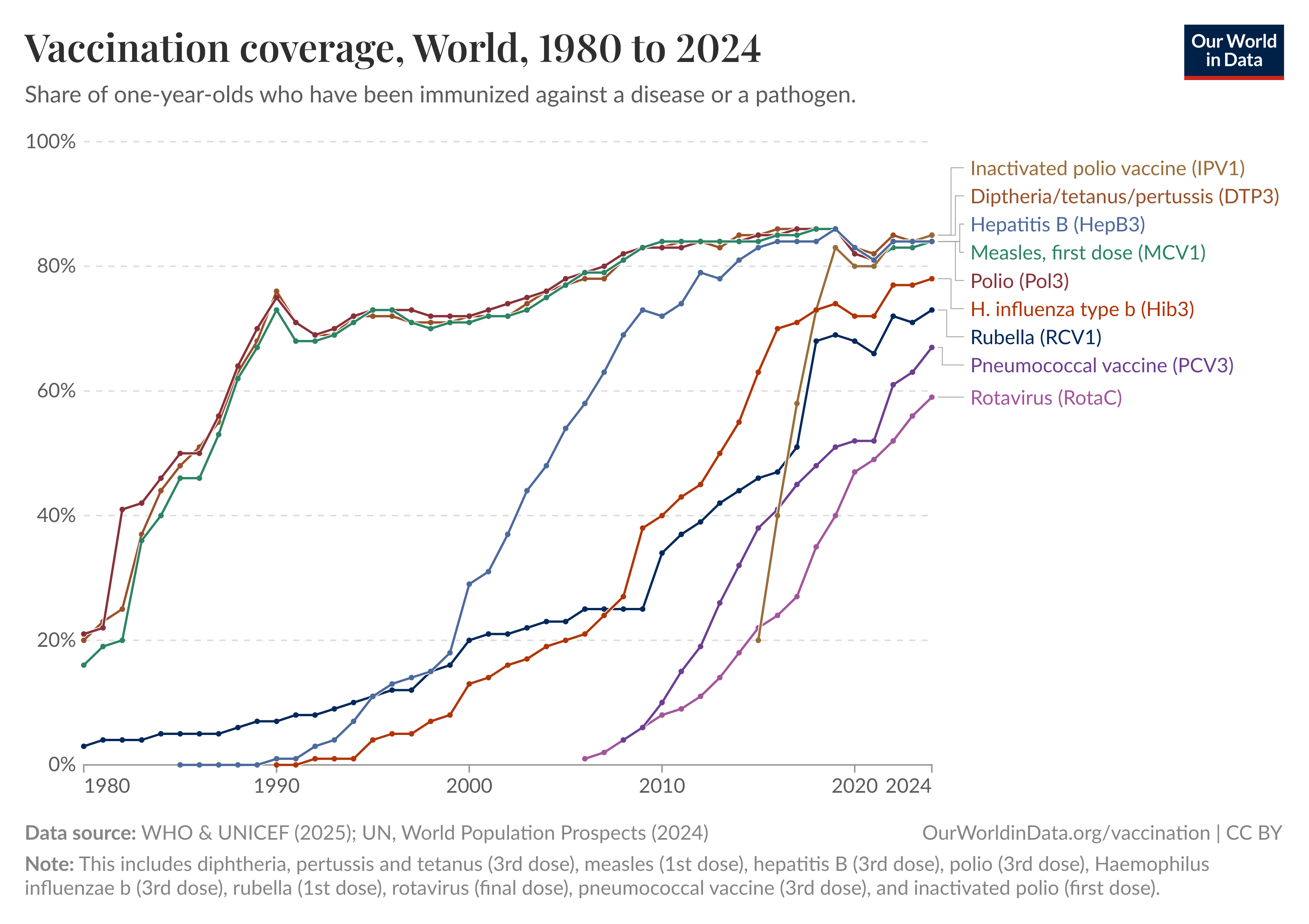
Global vaccination coverage 1980 to 2019 among one year olds

A vaccination schedule is a series of vaccinations, including the timing of all doses, which may be either recommended or compulsory, depending on the country of residence. A vaccine is an antigenic preparation used to produce active immunity to a disease, in order to prevent or reduce the effects of infection by any natural or "wild" pathogen. Vaccines go through multiple phases of trials to ensure safety and effectiveness. World Health Organization-guided childhood vaccine schedules protect against 30 infectious diseases, and following them is crucial to prevent risks to children and the community, having saved over 154 million lives in the past 50 years.

Many vaccines require multiple doses for maximum effectiveness, either to produce sufficient initial immune response or to boost response that fades over time. For example, tetanus vaccine boosters are often recommended every 10 years. Vaccine schedules are developed by governmental agencies or physicians groups to achieve maximum effectiveness using required and recommended vaccines for a locality while minimizing the number of health care system interactions. Over the past two decades, the recommended vaccination schedule has grown rapidly and become more complicated as many new vaccines have been developed.

Some vaccines are recommended only in certain areas (countries, sub national areas, or at-risk populations) where a disease is common. For instance, yellow fever vaccination is on the routine vaccine schedule of French Guiana, is recommended in certain regions of Brazil but in the United States is only given to travelers heading to countries with a history of the disease. In developing countries, vaccine recommendations also take into account the level of health care access, the cost of vaccines and issues with vaccine availability and storage.

Sample vaccination schedules discussed by the World Health Organization show a developed country using a schedule which extends over the first five years of a child's life and uses vaccines which cost over $700 including administration costs while a developing country uses a schedule providing vaccines in the first 9 months of life and costing only $25. This difference is due to the lower cost of health care, the lower cost of many vaccines provided to developing nations, and that more expensive vaccines, often for less common diseases, are not utilized.

== Worldwide ==
Childhood vaccine schedules, guided by World Health Organization and developed by global experts, protect against 30 infectious diseases. Following the recommended schedule is crucial, as delays or changes increase risk for children and the community.

The World Health Organization monitors vaccination schedules across the world, noting what vaccines are included in each country's program, the coverage rates achieved and various auditing measures. The table below shows the types of vaccines given in example countries. The WHO publishes on its website current vaccination schedules for all WHO member states. Additional vaccines are given to individuals more likely to come into contact with specific diseases through work or travel (e.g. military), or after potentially infectious exposure. Examples include rabies, anthrax, cholera and smallpox.

Diseases covered by the vaccination schedule in each country
Country	Chickenpox	Cholera	COVID-19	Diphtheria	Tick-borne encephalitis	Hepatitis A	Hepatitis B	H. influenzae	HPV	Influenza	J. encephalitis	Malaria	Measles	Meningococcal	Mpox	Mumps	Pertussis	Pneumococcal	Polio	Rabies	Rotavirus	RSV	Rubella	Shingles	Tetanus	Tuberculosis	Typhoid fever	Yellow fever	Ref.
Afghanistan			Yes	Yes			Yes	Yes					Yes				Yes	Yes	Yes		Yes				Yes	Yes			
Albania			Yes	Yes			Yes	Yes		Yes			Yes			Yes	Yes	Yes	Yes		Yes		Yes		Yes	Yes			
Algeria				Yes			Yes	Yes		Yes			Yes			Yes	Yes	Yes	Yes				Yes		Yes	Yes			
Andorra	Yes		Yes	Yes					Yes	Yes			Yes	Yes	Yes	Yes		Yes	Yes				Yes		Yes				
Angola			Yes	Yes			Yes	Yes					Yes				Yes	Yes	Yes		Yes		Yes		Yes	Yes		Yes	
Antigua and Barbuda	Yes			Yes			Yes	Yes	Yes	Yes			Yes			Yes	Yes	Yes	Yes				Yes		Yes			Yes	
Argentina	Yes			Yes		Yes	Yes	Yes	Yes	Yes			Yes			Yes	Yes	Yes	Yes	Yes	Yes	Yes	Yes	Yes	Yes	Yes		Yes	
Armenia			Yes	Yes		Yes	Yes	Yes	Yes	Yes			Yes	Yes		Yes	Yes	Yes	Yes	Yes	Yes		Yes		Yes	Yes			
Australia	Yes		Yes	Yes		Yes	Yes	Yes	Yes	Yes			Yes			Yes	Yes				Yes		Yes	Yes	Yes				
Austria			Yes	Yes		Yes	Yes		Yes	Yes			Yes			Yes	Yes	Yes	Yes		Yes	Yes	Yes		Yes				
Azerbaijan				Yes			Yes	Yes					Yes			Yes	Yes	Yes	Yes				Yes		Yes	Yes			
Bahamas	Yes		Yes	Yes		Yes	Yes	Yes	Yes	Yes			Yes		Yes	Yes	Yes	Yes	Yes		Yes		Yes		Yes			Yes	
Bahrain	Yes	Yes	Yes	Yes		Yes	Yes	Yes	Yes	Yes			Yes			Yes	Yes	Yes	Yes		Yes	Yes	Yes		Yes	Yes		Yes	
Bangladesh			Yes	Yes			Yes	Yes	Yes				Yes				Yes	Yes	Yes				Yes		Yes	Yes			
Barbados	Yes		Yes	Yes		Yes	Yes	Yes	Yes	Yes			Yes			Yes	Yes	Yes	Yes				Yes		Yes	Yes		Yes	
Belarus			Yes	Yes			Yes	Yes		Yes			Yes			Yes	Yes	Yes	Yes				Yes		Yes	Yes			
Belgium			Yes	Yes		Yes	Yes	Yes	Yes	Yes			Yes	Yes	Yes	Yes	Yes	Yes	Yes		Yes	Yes	Yes		Yes				
Belize			Yes	Yes			Yes	Yes	Yes	Yes			Yes			Yes	Yes		Yes	Yes			Yes		Yes	Yes		Yes	
Benin			Yes	Yes			Yes	Yes	Yes			Yes	Yes				Yes	Yes	Yes				Yes		Yes	Yes		Yes	
Bhutan			Yes	Yes			Yes	Yes	Yes				Yes			Yes	Yes		Yes				Yes		Yes	Yes			
Bolivia			Yes	Yes			Yes	Yes	Yes	Yes			Yes			Yes	Yes	Yes	Yes		Yes		Yes		Yes	Yes		Yes	
Bosnia and Herzegovina				Yes		Yes	Yes	Yes		Yes			Yes			Yes	Yes	Yes	Yes				Yes		Yes	Yes		Yes	
Botswana			Yes	Yes			Yes	Yes	Yes				Yes				Yes	Yes	Yes		Yes		Yes		Yes	Yes			
Brazil	Yes	Yes	Yes	Yes		Yes	Yes	Yes	Yes	Yes			Yes	Yes		Yes	Yes	Yes	Yes		Yes		Yes		Yes	Yes		Yes	
Brunei			Yes	Yes			Yes	Yes	Yes	Yes			Yes				Yes		Yes				Yes		Yes	Yes			
Bulgaria			Yes	Yes			Yes	Yes	Yes	Yes			Yes			Yes	Yes	Yes	Yes	Yes	Yes		Yes		Yes	Yes			
Burkina Faso				Yes			Yes	Yes				Yes	Yes				Yes	Yes	Yes		Yes		Yes		Yes	Yes		Yes	
Burundi				Yes			Yes	Yes	Yes				Yes				Yes	Yes	Yes		Yes		Yes		Yes	Yes		Yes	
Cape Verde				Yes			Yes	Yes	Yes				Yes			Yes	Yes		Yes				Yes		Yes	Yes		Yes	
Cambodia				Yes			Yes	Yes	Yes		Yes		Yes				Yes		Yes				Yes		Yes	Yes			
Cameroon			Yes	Yes			Yes	Yes	Yes			Yes	Yes				Yes	Yes	Yes		Yes		Yes		Yes	Yes		Yes	
Canada	Yes		Yes	Yes		Yes	Yes	Yes	Yes	Yes			Yes	Yes		Yes	Yes	Yes	Yes		Yes		Yes	Yes	Yes	Yes			
Central African Republic			Yes	Yes			Yes	Yes				Yes	Yes				Yes	Yes	Yes		Yes				Yes	Yes		Yes	
Chad			Yes	Yes			Yes	Yes				Yes	Yes				Yes		Yes						Yes	Yes		Yes	
Chile			Yes	Yes		Yes	Yes	Yes	Yes	Yes			Yes			Yes	Yes	Yes	Yes			Yes	Yes		Yes	Yes		Yes	
China				Yes		Yes	Yes				Yes		Yes				Yes						Yes		Yes	Yes			
Colombia	Yes		Yes	Yes		Yes	Yes	Yes	Yes	Yes			Yes		Yes	Yes	Yes	Yes	Yes	Yes	Yes		Yes		Yes	Yes		Yes	
Comoros			Yes	Yes			Yes	Yes					Yes				Yes	Yes	Yes						Yes	Yes			
Congo			Yes	Yes			Yes	Yes					Yes				Yes	Yes	Yes		Yes		Yes		Yes	Yes		Yes	
Cook Islands				Yes			Yes	Yes	Yes				Yes				Yes		Yes				Yes		Yes	Yes			
Costa Rica	Yes		Yes	Yes			Yes	Yes	Yes	Yes			Yes			Yes	Yes	Yes	Yes	Yes	Yes		Yes		Yes	Yes			
Croatia			Yes	Yes			Yes		Yes	Yes			Yes			Yes	Yes						Yes		Yes	Yes			
Cuba				Yes			Yes	Yes		Yes			Yes	Yes		Yes	Yes		Yes				Yes		Yes	Yes			
Cyprus			Yes	Yes		Yes	Yes	Yes	Yes	Yes			Yes	Yes		Yes	Yes	Yes	Yes				Yes		Yes	Yes		Yes	
Czech Republic			Yes	Yes		Yes	Yes	Yes	Yes	Yes			Yes			Yes	Yes		Yes				Yes		Yes	Yes			
Denmark			Yes	Yes			Yes	Yes	Yes	Yes			Yes		Yes	Yes	Yes	Yes	Yes				Yes		Yes				
Djibouti				Yes			Yes	Yes					Yes				Yes	Yes	Yes		Yes				Yes	Yes			
Dominica			Yes	Yes			Yes	Yes	Yes	Yes			Yes			Yes	Yes		Yes				Yes		Yes	Yes		Yes	
Dominican Republic			Yes	Yes			Yes	Yes	Yes	Yes			Yes			Yes	Yes	Yes	Yes	Yes	Yes		Yes		Yes	Yes		Yes	
DR Congo				Yes			Yes	Yes					Yes				Yes	Yes	Yes		Yes				Yes	Yes		Yes	
Ecuador	Yes		Yes	Yes			Yes	Yes	Yes	Yes			Yes			Yes	Yes	Yes	Yes		Yes		Yes		Yes	Yes		Yes	
Egypt			Yes	Yes			Yes	Yes		Yes			Yes	Yes		Yes	Yes	Yes	Yes				Yes		Yes	Yes		Yes	
El Salvador			Yes	Yes			Yes	Yes		Yes			Yes			Yes	Yes	Yes	Yes		Yes		Yes		Yes	Yes		Yes	
Equatorial Guinea				Yes			Yes	Yes					Yes				Yes		Yes						Yes	Yes		Yes	
Eritrea				Yes			Yes	Yes	Yes				Yes				Yes	Yes	Yes		Yes		Yes		Yes	Yes			
Estonia			Yes	Yes			Yes	Yes	Yes	Yes			Yes			Yes	Yes		Yes		Yes		Yes		Yes	Yes			
Eswatini			Yes	Yes			Yes	Yes	Yes				Yes				Yes	Yes	Yes		Yes		Yes		Yes	Yes			
Ethiopia			Yes	Yes			Yes	Yes	Yes				Yes				Yes	Yes	Yes		Yes				Yes	Yes			
Fiji			Yes	Yes			Yes	Yes	Yes				Yes				Yes		Yes		Yes		Yes		Yes	Yes			
Finland	Yes		Yes	Yes	Yes		Yes	Yes	Yes	Yes			Yes			Yes	Yes	Yes	Yes		Yes		Yes		Yes	Yes			
France			Yes	Yes			Yes		Yes	Yes			Yes	Yes		Yes	Yes	Yes					Yes	Yes	Yes	Yes		Yes	
Gabon				Yes			Yes	Yes					Yes				Yes		Yes						Yes	Yes		Yes	
Gambia			Yes	Yes			Yes	Yes	Yes				Yes				Yes	Yes	Yes		Yes		Yes		Yes	Yes		Yes	
Georgia				Yes			Yes		Yes	Yes			Yes			Yes	Yes	Yes	Yes		Yes		Yes		Yes	Yes			
Germany	Yes		Yes	Yes			Yes	Yes	Yes	Yes			Yes	Yes	Yes	Yes	Yes	Yes	Yes		Yes	Yes	Yes	Yes	Yes				
Ghana			Yes	Yes			Yes	Yes				Yes	Yes				Yes	Yes	Yes		Yes		Yes		Yes	Yes		Yes	
Greece	Yes		Yes	Yes		Yes	Yes		Yes	Yes			Yes	Yes		Yes	Yes	Yes			Yes		Yes		Yes	Yes			
Grenada	Yes		Yes	Yes			Yes	Yes	Yes	Yes			Yes			Yes	Yes		Yes				Yes		Yes			Yes	
Guatemala			Yes	Yes			Yes	Yes	Yes	Yes			Yes			Yes	Yes	Yes	Yes		Yes		Yes		Yes	Yes		Yes	
Guinea			Yes	Yes			Yes	Yes					Yes				Yes		Yes						Yes	Yes		Yes	
Guinea-Bissau			Yes	Yes			Yes	Yes					Yes				Yes	Yes	Yes		Yes				Yes	Yes		Yes	
Guyana	Yes			Yes			Yes	Yes	Yes				Yes			Yes	Yes	Yes	Yes		Yes		Yes		Yes	Yes		Yes	
Haiti			Yes	Yes			Yes	Yes					Yes				Yes	Yes	Yes		Yes		Yes		Yes	Yes			
Honduras			Yes	Yes		Yes	Yes	Yes	Yes	Yes			Yes			Yes	Yes	Yes	Yes		Yes		Yes		Yes	Yes		Yes	
Hong Kong	Yes		Yes	Yes			Yes		Yes				Yes		Yes	Yes	Yes	Yes	Yes				Yes		Yes	Yes			
Hungary			Yes	Yes			Yes	Yes	Yes	Yes			Yes			Yes	Yes	Yes	Yes				Yes		Yes	Yes			
Iceland			Yes	Yes			Yes	Yes	Yes	Yes			Yes	Yes	Yes	Yes	Yes	Yes	Yes				Yes		Yes				
India				Yes			Yes	Yes			Yes		Yes				Yes		Yes		Yes		Yes		Yes	Yes			
Indonesia			Yes	Yes			Yes	Yes	Yes		Yes		Yes			Yes	Yes		Yes				Yes		Yes	Yes			
Iran	Yes			Yes			Yes	Yes		Yes			Yes			Yes	Yes	Yes	Yes				Yes		Yes	Yes		Yes	
Iraq			Yes	Yes		Yes	Yes	Yes		Yes			Yes			Yes	Yes	Yes	Yes		Yes		Yes		Yes	Yes			
Ireland			Yes	Yes			Yes		Yes	Yes			Yes	Yes		Yes	Yes	Yes			Yes		Yes		Yes	Yes			
Israel	Yes			Yes	Yes	Yes	Yes	Yes	Yes	Yes	Yes		Yes			Yes	Yes	Yes	Yes		Yes		Yes	Yes	Yes	Yes	Yes	Yes	
Italy	Yes		Yes	Yes		Yes	Yes	Yes	Yes	Yes			Yes	Yes		Yes	Yes	Yes	Yes		Yes		Yes	Yes	Yes	Yes			
Ivory Coast			Yes	Yes			Yes	Yes	Yes	Yes		Yes	Yes				Yes	Yes	Yes		Yes		Yes		Yes	Yes		Yes	
Jamaica			Yes	Yes			Yes	Yes	Yes	Yes			Yes			Yes	Yes	Yes	Yes				Yes		Yes	Yes		Yes	
Japan	Yes		Yes	Yes			Yes	Yes	Yes	Yes	Yes		Yes				Yes		Yes				Yes		Yes	Yes			
Jordan			Yes	Yes			Yes	Yes		Yes			Yes			Yes	Yes		Yes		Yes		Yes		Yes	Yes			
Kazakhstan				Yes	Yes	Yes	Yes	Yes		Yes			Yes			Yes	Yes	Yes	Yes	Yes			Yes		Yes	Yes			
Kenya			Yes	Yes			Yes	Yes	Yes	Yes		Yes	Yes				Yes	Yes	Yes		Yes		Yes		Yes	Yes		Yes	
Kiribati				Yes			Yes	Yes		Yes			Yes				Yes		Yes		Yes		Yes		Yes	Yes			
Kuwait	Yes		Yes	Yes		Yes	Yes	Yes		Yes			Yes	Yes		Yes	Yes	Yes	Yes		Yes		Yes		Yes	Yes	Yes	Yes	
Kyrgyzstan				Yes			Yes	Yes					Yes			Yes	Yes	Yes	Yes		Yes		Yes		Yes	Yes			
Laos			Yes	Yes			Yes	Yes	Yes	Yes	Yes		Yes				Yes		Yes		Yes		Yes		Yes	Yes			
Latvia	Yes		Yes	Yes	Yes		Yes	Yes	Yes	Yes			Yes			Yes	Yes	Yes	Yes	Yes	Yes		Yes		Yes	Yes			
Lebanon				Yes			Yes	Yes		Yes			Yes			Yes	Yes	Yes	Yes				Yes		Yes				
Lesotho				Yes			Yes	Yes					Yes				Yes	Yes	Yes		Yes		Yes		Yes	Yes		Yes	
Liberia			Yes	Yes			Yes	Yes	Yes				Yes				Yes	Yes	Yes		Yes				Yes	Yes		Yes	
Libya				Yes			Yes	Yes	Yes	Yes			Yes			Yes	Yes	Yes	Yes		Yes		Yes		Yes	Yes		Yes	
Lithuania			Yes	Yes			Yes	Yes	Yes	Yes			Yes			Yes	Yes	Yes	Yes	Yes	Yes		Yes		Yes	Yes			
Luxembourg	Yes		Yes	Yes				Yes	Yes	Yes			Yes	Yes	Yes	Yes	Yes	Yes	Yes		Yes	Yes	Yes		Yes		Yes	Yes	
Madagascar			Yes	Yes			Yes	Yes					Yes				Yes	Yes	Yes		Yes				Yes	Yes			
Malawi			Yes	Yes			Yes	Yes	Yes			Yes	Yes				Yes	Yes	Yes		Yes		Yes		Yes	Yes			
Malaysia			Yes	Yes			Yes	Yes	Yes	Yes	Yes		Yes				Yes		Yes				Yes		Yes	Yes		Yes	
Maldives			Yes	Yes			Yes	Yes	Yes				Yes				Yes		Yes				Yes		Yes	Yes		Yes	
Mali				Yes			Yes	Yes	Yes				Yes				Yes	Yes	Yes		Yes				Yes	Yes		Yes	
Malta			Yes	Yes			Yes	Yes	Yes	Yes			Yes		Yes	Yes	Yes	Yes	Yes				Yes		Yes	Yes			
Marshall Islands	Yes			Yes			Yes	Yes	Yes	Yes			Yes				Yes		Yes		Yes		Yes		Yes	Yes			
Mauritania				Yes			Yes	Yes	Yes				Yes				Yes	Yes	Yes		Yes		Yes		Yes	Yes			
Mauritius				Yes		Yes	Yes		Yes	Yes			Yes			Yes		Yes	Yes		Yes		Yes		Yes	Yes			
Mexico	Yes		Yes	Yes		Yes	Yes	Yes	Yes	Yes			Yes			Yes	Yes	Yes	Yes		Yes		Yes		Yes	Yes			
Federated States of Micronesia				Yes			Yes	Yes	Yes				Yes				Yes		Yes		Yes		Yes		Yes	Yes			
Moldova			Yes	Yes			Yes	Yes	Yes	Yes			Yes			Yes	Yes	Yes	Yes		Yes		Yes		Yes	Yes			
Monaco			Yes	Yes			Yes	Yes	Yes	Yes			Yes	Yes		Yes		Yes	Yes				Yes		Yes				
Mongolia				Yes		Yes	Yes	Yes		Yes			Yes				Yes		Yes				Yes		Yes	Yes			
Montenegro			Yes	Yes			Yes	Yes		Yes			Yes			Yes	Yes		Yes				Yes		Yes	Yes			
Morocco				Yes			Yes	Yes		Yes			Yes				Yes	Yes	Yes		Yes		Yes		Yes	Yes			
Mozambique				Yes			Yes	Yes				Yes	Yes				Yes	Yes	Yes		Yes		Yes		Yes	Yes			
Myanmar			Yes	Yes			Yes	Yes			Yes		Yes				Yes		Yes				Yes		Yes	Yes			
Namibia				Yes			Yes	Yes					Yes				Yes	Yes	Yes		Yes		Yes		Yes	Yes			
Nauru				Yes			Yes	Yes					Yes				Yes		Yes				Yes		Yes	Yes			
Nepal			Yes	Yes			Yes	Yes			Yes		Yes				Yes		Yes				Yes		Yes	Yes			
Netherlands			Yes	Yes		Yes	Yes	Yes	Yes	Yes			Yes	Yes	Yes	Yes	Yes	Yes	Yes		Yes	Yes	Yes		Yes				
New Zealand	Yes		Yes	Yes		Yes	Yes	Yes	Yes	Yes			Yes			Yes	Yes		Yes		Yes		Yes	Yes	Yes	Yes			
Nicaragua			Yes	Yes			Yes	Yes		Yes			Yes			Yes	Yes	Yes	Yes		Yes		Yes		Yes	Yes		Yes	
Niger			Yes	Yes			Yes	Yes				Yes	Yes				Yes	Yes	Yes		Yes				Yes	Yes		Yes	
Nigeria			Yes	Yes			Yes	Yes	Yes			Yes	Yes				Yes	Yes	Yes		Yes				Yes	Yes		Yes	
Niue				Yes			Yes	Yes		Yes			Yes				Yes		Yes		Yes		Yes		Yes	Yes			
North Korea				Yes			Yes	Yes					Yes				Yes		Yes						Yes	Yes			
North Macedonia			Yes	Yes			Yes	Yes	Yes	Yes			Yes			Yes	Yes		Yes				Yes		Yes	Yes			
Norway			Yes	Yes			Yes	Yes	Yes	Yes			Yes			Yes	Yes	Yes	Yes		Yes		Yes		Yes	Yes			
Oman	Yes			Yes			Yes	Yes		Yes			Yes			Yes	Yes	Yes	Yes				Yes		Yes	Yes	Yes	Yes	
Pakistan			Yes	Yes			Yes	Yes					Yes				Yes	Yes	Yes		Yes				Yes	Yes			
Palau			Yes	Yes			Yes	Yes	Yes	Yes			Yes				Yes		Yes		Yes		Yes		Yes				
Panama	Yes		Yes	Yes		Yes	Yes	Yes	Yes	Yes			Yes			Yes	Yes	Yes		Yes	Yes		Yes		Yes	Yes		Yes	
Papua New Guinea			Yes	Yes			Yes	Yes	Yes				Yes				Yes		Yes				Yes		Yes	Yes			
Paraguay	Yes		Yes	Yes		Yes	Yes	Yes	Yes	Yes			Yes			Yes	Yes	Yes	Yes		Yes		Yes	Yes	Yes	Yes		Yes	
Peru	Yes		Yes	Yes			Yes	Yes	Yes	Yes			Yes		Yes	Yes	Yes	Yes	Yes		Yes		Yes		Yes	Yes		Yes	
Philippines			Yes	Yes			Yes	Yes	Yes	Yes			Yes				Yes		Yes				Yes		Yes	Yes			
Poland	Yes			Yes			Yes	Yes		Yes			Yes			Yes	Yes	Yes	Yes	Yes			Yes		Yes	Yes			
Portugal			Yes	Yes			Yes	Yes	Yes	Yes			Yes	Yes	Yes	Yes	Yes	Yes	Yes	Yes			Yes		Yes	Yes		Yes	
Qatar	Yes		Yes	Yes		Yes	Yes	Yes		Yes			Yes			Yes	Yes	Yes	Yes		Yes		Yes		Yes	Yes			
Romania	Yes		Yes	Yes			Yes	Yes		Yes			Yes			Yes	Yes	Yes	Yes		Yes		Yes		Yes	Yes		Yes	
Russia	Yes		Yes	Yes		Yes	Yes	Yes	Yes	Yes			Yes			Yes	Yes	Yes	Yes		Yes		Yes		Yes	Yes		Yes	
Rwanda				Yes			Yes	Yes	Yes				Yes				Yes	Yes	Yes		Yes		Yes		Yes	Yes			
Saint Kitts and Nevis			Yes	Yes			Yes	Yes	Yes	Yes			Yes			Yes	Yes		Yes				Yes		Yes	Yes		Yes	
Saint Lucia	Yes		Yes	Yes			Yes	Yes	Yes	Yes			Yes			Yes	Yes	Yes	Yes				Yes		Yes	Yes		Yes	
Saint Vincent and the Grenadines			Yes	Yes			Yes	Yes	Yes				Yes			Yes	Yes		Yes				Yes		Yes	Yes		Yes	
Samoa			Yes	Yes			Yes	Yes					Yes				Yes		Yes				Yes		Yes	Yes			
San Marino	Yes	Yes	Yes	Yes		Yes	Yes	Yes	Yes	Yes	Yes		Yes			Yes	Yes	Yes	Yes	Yes			Yes	Yes	Yes			Yes	
São Tomé and Príncipe			Yes	Yes			Yes	Yes	Yes				Yes				Yes	Yes	Yes		Yes		Yes		Yes	Yes		Yes	
Saudi Arabia	Yes		Yes	Yes		Yes	Yes	Yes		Yes			Yes			Yes	Yes	Yes			Yes	Yes	Yes		Yes	Yes		Yes	
Senegal			Yes	Yes			Yes	Yes	Yes				Yes				Yes	Yes	Yes		Yes		Yes		Yes	Yes		Yes	
Serbia			Yes	Yes		Yes	Yes	Yes		Yes			Yes			Yes	Yes	Yes	Yes				Yes		Yes	Yes	Yes	Yes	
Seychelles				Yes			Yes	Yes	Yes				Yes			Yes	Yes	Yes	Yes		Yes		Yes		Yes	Yes		Yes	
Sierra Leone				Yes			Yes	Yes	Yes			Yes	Yes				Yes	Yes	Yes		Yes		Yes		Yes	Yes		Yes	
Singapore			Yes	Yes			Yes	Yes	Yes	Yes			Yes				Yes		Yes				Yes		Yes	Yes			
Slovakia			Yes	Yes			Yes	Yes		Yes			Yes			Yes	Yes	Yes	Yes				Yes		Yes				
Slovenia	Yes		Yes	Yes	Yes		Yes	Yes	Yes	Yes			Yes		Yes	Yes	Yes	Yes	Yes	Yes		Yes	Yes		Yes	Yes			
Solomon Islands				Yes			Yes	Yes	Yes				Yes				Yes		Yes				Yes		Yes	Yes			
Somalia			Yes	Yes			Yes	Yes					Yes				Yes		Yes						Yes	Yes			
South Africa				Yes			Yes		Yes	Yes			Yes					Yes	Yes		Yes				Yes	Yes			
South Korea	Yes		Yes	Yes		Yes	Yes	Yes	Yes	Yes	Yes		Yes		Yes		Yes		Yes				Yes		Yes	Yes	Yes		
South Sudan			Yes	Yes			Yes	Yes				Yes	Yes				Yes		Yes						Yes	Yes			
Spain	Yes	Yes	Yes	Yes		Yes	Yes	Yes	Yes	Yes	Yes		Yes	Yes	Yes	Yes	Yes	Yes	Yes			Yes	Yes	Yes	Yes			Yes	
Sri Lanka				Yes			Yes	Yes	Yes		Yes		Yes				Yes		Yes				Yes		Yes	Yes		Yes	
Sudan			Yes	Yes			Yes	Yes				Yes	Yes	Yes			Yes	Yes	Yes		Yes				Yes	Yes			
Suriname				Yes			Yes	Yes	Yes	Yes			Yes			Yes	Yes		Yes	Yes			Yes		Yes			Yes	
Sweden			Yes	Yes			Yes	Yes	Yes	Yes			Yes		Yes	Yes	Yes	Yes	Yes		Yes		Yes		Yes	Yes			
Switzerland	Yes		Yes	Yes			Yes	Yes	Yes	Yes			Yes	Yes	Yes	Yes	Yes	Yes	Yes			Yes	Yes		Yes				
Syria			Yes	Yes			Yes	Yes		Yes			Yes	Yes		Yes	Yes		Yes				Yes		Yes	Yes			
Tajikistan				Yes			Yes	Yes		Yes			Yes				Yes		Yes		Yes		Yes		Yes	Yes			
Tanzania				Yes			Yes	Yes	Yes				Yes				Yes	Yes	Yes		Yes		Yes		Yes	Yes			
Thailand				Yes			Yes		Yes	Yes	Yes		Yes								Yes		Yes		Yes	Yes			
Timor-Leste			Yes	Yes			Yes	Yes					Yes				Yes		Yes		Yes		Yes		Yes	Yes			
Togo			Yes	Yes			Yes	Yes	Yes				Yes				Yes	Yes	Yes		Yes		Yes		Yes	Yes		Yes	
Tonga				Yes			Yes	Yes	Yes				Yes				Yes		Yes		Yes		Yes		Yes	Yes			
Trinidad and Tobago	Yes			Yes			Yes	Yes	Yes	Yes			Yes			Yes	Yes	Yes	Yes				Yes		Yes			Yes	
Tunisia				Yes		Yes	Yes	Yes		Yes			Yes				Yes		Yes				Yes		Yes	Yes			
Turkey	Yes			Yes		Yes	Yes	Yes		Yes			Yes			Yes	Yes	Yes	Yes				Yes		Yes	Yes			
Turkmenistan				Yes		Yes	Yes	Yes	Yes	Yes			Yes			Yes	Yes	Yes	Yes		Yes		Yes		Yes	Yes			
Tuvalu				Yes			Yes	Yes		Yes			Yes				Yes		Yes				Yes		Yes	Yes			
Uganda			Yes	Yes			Yes	Yes	Yes				Yes				Yes	Yes	Yes		Yes		Yes		Yes	Yes			
Ukraine			Yes	Yes			Yes	Yes		Yes			Yes			Yes	Yes		Yes				Yes		Yes	Yes			
United Arab Emirates	Yes	Yes		Yes		Yes	Yes	Yes		Yes			Yes		Yes	Yes	Yes	Yes	Yes		Yes	Yes	Yes	Yes	Yes	Yes		Yes	
United Kingdom			Yes	Yes			Yes	Yes	Yes	Yes			Yes	Yes		Yes	Yes	Yes	Yes	Yes	Yes	Yes	Yes	Yes	Yes	Yes			
United States	Yes			Yes		Yes	Yes	Yes	Yes	Yes			Yes			Yes	Yes	Yes	Yes		Yes		Yes	Yes	Yes				
Uruguay	Yes			Yes		Yes	Yes	Yes	Yes	Yes			Yes			Yes	Yes	Yes	Yes				Yes		Yes	Yes		Yes	
Uzbekistan			Yes	Yes			Yes	Yes		Yes			Yes			Yes	Yes	Yes	Yes		Yes		Yes		Yes	Yes			
Vanuatu				Yes			Yes	Yes	Yes				Yes				Yes		Yes				Yes		Yes	Yes			
Venezuela				Yes			Yes	Yes		Yes			Yes	Yes		Yes	Yes	Yes	Yes	Yes	Yes		Yes		Yes	Yes		Yes	
Vietnam			Yes	Yes			Yes	Yes		Yes	Yes		Yes				Yes		Yes				Yes		Yes	Yes			
Yemen			Yes	Yes			Yes	Yes					Yes				Yes	Yes	Yes		Yes		Yes		Yes	Yes			
Zambia			Yes	Yes			Yes	Yes					Yes				Yes	Yes	Yes		Yes		Yes		Yes	Yes			
Zimbabwe		Yes		Yes			Yes	Yes		Yes			Yes				Yes		Yes	Yes	Yes				Yes				

== By country ==
=== Australia ===
The Immunise Australia Program implements the National Immunization Program (NIP) Schedule. All vaccines available under the Australian immunization schedule are free of charge under the Pharmaceutical Benefits Scheme.

Vaccine Schedule for Australia: 1 April 2019
Infection	Birth	Months					Years							Preg Women
Infection	Birth	2	4	6	12	18	4	12–<13	14–<16	>15	>50	65+	70	Preg Women
Rotavirus		RV†	RV†											
Hepatitis A					HepA§ (Note: Queensland, Northern Territory, Western Australia, South Australia)	HepA§								
Hepatitis B	HepB†	DTaP-HepB-IPV-Hib†	DTaP-HepB-IPV-Hib†	DTaP-HepB-IPV-Hib†	DTaP-HepB-IPV-Hib‡			DTaP-HepB-IPV-Hib‡	DTaP-HepB-IPV-Hib‡ (Note: All people aged less than 20 years are eligible for free catch up vaccines.)					
Diphtheria		DTaP-HepB-IPV-Hib†	DTaP-HepB-IPV-Hib†	DTaP-HepB-IPV-Hib†	DTaP-HepB-IPV-Hib‡			Tdap†	DTaP-HepB-IPV-Hib‡					Tdap†
Pertussis		DTaP-HepB-IPV-Hib†	DTaP-HepB-IPV-Hib†	DTaP-HepB-IPV-Hib†	DTaP-HepB-IPV-Hib‡			Tdap†	DTaP-HepB-IPV-Hib‡					Tdap†
Tetanus		DTaP-HepB-IPV-Hib†	DTaP-HepB-IPV-Hib†	DTaP-HepB-IPV-Hib†	DTaP-HepB-IPV-Hib‡			Tdap†	DTaP-HepB-IPV-Hib‡					Tdap†
Polio		DTaP-HepB-IPV-Hib†	DTaP-HepB-IPV-Hib†	DTaP-HepB-IPV-Hib†	DTaP-HepB-IPV-Hib‡			DTaP-HepB-IPV-Hib‡	DTaP-HepB-IPV-Hib‡					
Haemophilus influenzae		DTaP-HepB-IPV-Hib†	DTaP-HepB-IPV-Hib†	DTaP-HepB-IPV-Hib†	DTaP-HepB-IPV-Hib‡			DTaP-HepB-IPV-Hib‡	DTaP-HepB-IPV-Hib‡					
Meningococcus					MenACWY†	MenACWY‡			MenACWY†	MenACWY‡				
Pneumococcus		PCV13†	PCV13†	PCV13#	PCV13†	PCV13‡								
Pneumococcus		PCV13†	PCV13†	PCV13§	PCV13†	PCV13‡								
Pneumococcus							PPSV23#			PPSV23#§	PPSV23§	PPSV23†		
Measles					MMR†	MMRV†	MMRV‡							
Mumps					MMR†	MMRV†	MMRV‡							
Rubella					MMR†	MMRV†	MMRV‡							
Varicella						MMRV†	MMRV‡							
Human papillomavirus								HPV x2†	HPV x2‡					
Influenza				IIV (yearly)†								IIV (yearly)†		
Influenza				IIV (yearly)#								IIV (yearly)†		
Influenza				IIV (yearly)§								IIV (yearly)†		
Herpes Zoster													ZVL	
† Recommended ages for everyone.; # Recommended ages for certain other high-risk groups.; ‡ Recommended ages for catch-up immunization.; § Recommended range of additional vaccinations for Aboriginals and Torres Strait Islanders.

=== Austria ===
Austrian vaccine recommendations are developed by the National Vaccination Board (German: Nationales Impfgremium), which is part of the Federal Ministry of Social Affairs, Health, Care and Consumer Protection.

Children aged 14 and older can be vaccinated without parental consent.

=== Brazil ===
All recommended vaccines are provide free of charge by the public health services.

Brazilian National Vaccination Schedule: 2019
Infection	Gestation	Birth	Months								Years					
Infection	Gestation	Birth	2	3	4	5	6	9	12	15	4	5	9	11	10–59	60+
Tuberculosis		BCG														
Leprosy		BCG														
Hepatitis A										HepA						
Hepatitis B		HepB	5V		5V		5V									
Diphtheria	DTPa		5V		5V		5V			DTP	DTP				dT	
Tetanus	DTPa		5V		5V		5V			DTP	DTP				dT	
Pertussis	DTPa		5V		5V		5V			DTP	DTP				dT	
Haemophilus influenzae			5V		5V		5V									
Polio			IPV		IPV		IPV			OPV	OPV					
Pneumococcus			10v		10v				10v							
Meningococcus				MenC		MenC			MenC					MenC		
Rotavirus			RV		RV											
Measles									MMR	MMRV						
Mumps									MMR	MMRV						
Rubella									MMR	MMRV						
Varicella										MMRV	VV					
Yellow fever								YF								
Human papillomavirus													HPV x2 (girls)	HPV x2 (boys)		
Flu	IIV						IIV (yearly)									IIV (yearly)

=== Canada ===
In Canada, publicly funded immunization schedules may vary from province or territory.

==== Alberta ====
Alberta Vaccine Schedule: 2015
Infection	Months					Years			
Infection	2	4	6	12	18	4	10–13	15–17	65+
Hepatitis B						HepB			
Diphtheria	DTaP	DTaP	DTaP		DTaP	DTaP		Tdap	
Tetanus	DTaP	DTaP	DTaP		DTaP	DTaP		Tdap	
Pertussis	DTaP	DTaP	DTaP		DTaP	DTaP		Tdap	
Haemophilus influenzae	HIB	HIB	HIB		HIB				
Pneumococcus	PneuC13	PneuC13		PneuC13					
Polio	IPV	IPV	IPV		IPV	IPV			
Measles				MMRV		MMRV			
Mumps				MMRV		MMRV			
Rubella				MMRV		MMRV			
Varicella				MMRV		MMRV			
Meningococcus		MenC		MenC				MenC-ACYW	
Human papillomavirus							HPV	HPV (boys)	
Flu			IIV (yearly)						

==== British Columbia ====
British Columbia Vaccine Schedule: 2015
Infection	Months					Years			
Infection	2	4	6	12	18	4	10–13	15–17	65+
Hepatitis B	HepB	HepB	HepB						
Rotavirus	RV	RV							
Diphtheria	DTaP	DTaP	DTaP			DTaP		Tdap	
Tetanus	DTaP	DTaP	DTaP			DTaP		Tdap	
Pertussis	DTaP	DTaP	DTaP			DTaP		Tdap	
Haemophilus influenzae	HIB	HIB	HIB		HIB				
Pneumococcus	PneuC13	PneuC13		PneuC13					
Polio	IPV	IPV	IPV		IPV	IPV			
Measles				MMR		MMRV			
Mumps				MMR		MMRV			
Rubella				MMR		MMRV			
Varicella						MMRV	VV		
Meningococcus	MenCCV			MenCCV					
Human papillomavirus							HPV (girls)		
Flu			IIV (yearly)						

==== New Brunswick ====
New Brunswick Vaccine Schedule: 2015
Infection	Birth	Months					Years			
Infection	Birth	2	4	6	12	18	4	10–13	15–17	65+
Hepatitis B	HepB	HepB		HepB						
Diphtheria		DTaP	DTaP	DTaP		DTaP	DTaP		Tdap	
Tetanus		DTaP	DTaP	DTaP		DTaP	DTaP		Tdap	
Pertussis		DTaP	DTaP	DTaP		DTaP	DTaP		Tdap	
Haemophilus influenzae		HIB	HIB	HIB		HIB				
Pneumococcus		PneuC13	PneuC13		PneuC13					
Polio		IPV	IPV	IPV		IPV	IPV			
Measles					MMRV	MMRV				
Mumps					MMRV	MMRV				
Rubella					MMRV	MMRV				
Varicella					MMRV	MMRV				
Meningococcus					MenCCV				MenC-ACYW	
Human papillomavirus								HPV (girls)		
Flu				IIV (yearly)						

==== Ontario ====
Ontario Vaccine Schedule: 2017
Infection	Months						Years		
Infection	2	4	6	12	15	18	4	10–13	15–17
Hepatitis B								HepB	
Rotavirus	RV	RV							
Diphtheria	DTaP	DTaP	DTaP			DTaP	DTaP		Tdap
Tetanus	DTaP	DTaP	DTaP			DTaP	DTaP		Tdap
Pertussis	DTaP	DTaP	DTaP			DTaP	DTaP		Tdap
Haemophilus influenzae	HIB	HIB	HIB			HIB			
Pneumococcus	PCV13	PCV13		PCV13					
Polio	IPV	IPV	IPV			IPV	IPV		
Measles				MMRV			MMRV		
Mumps				MMRV			MMRV		
Rubella				MMRV			MMRV		
Varicella				MMRV	VV		MMRV		
Meningococcus				MenC				MenC-ACYW	
Human papillomavirus								HPV (girls)	

==== Quebec ====
Quebec Vaccine Schedule: 2019
Infection	Months					Years						
Infection	2	4	6	12	18	4–6	9	14–16	Adult	50	65	75
Hepatitis A							HepA					
Hepatitis B	HepB	HepB			HepB		HepB					
Rotavirus	RV	RV										
Diphtheria	DTaP	DTaP	DTaP		DTaP	Tdap		Tdap	Tdap	Tdap		
Tetanus	DTaP	DTaP	DTaP		DTaP	Tdap		Tdap	Tdap	Tdap		
Pertussis	DTaP	DTaP	DTaP		DTaP	Tdap		Tdap	Tdap	Tdap		
Haemophilus influenzae	HIB	HIB	HIB		HIB							
Pneumococcus	PCV10	PCV10		PCV10							PPV23	
Polio	IPV	IPV	IPV		IPV	IPV						
Measles				MMR	MMRV							
Mumps				MMR	MMRV							
Rubella				MMR	MMRV							
Varicella					MMRV	VV						
Meningococcus				MenCC				MenCC				
Human papillomavirus							HPV					
Flu			IIV	IIV	IIV							IIV (yearly)

=== Finland ===
Vaccination Schedule for Finland
Infection	Birth	Months						Years						
Infection	Birth	2	3	5	6	12	18	3	4	6	11–12	14–15	25	65+
Tuberculosis	BCG (Note: For specific at risk-groups only (to be given at the earliest age)))													
Rotavirus		RV	RV	RV										
Diphtheria			DTaP	DTaP		DTaP			DTaP			Tdap	Td (10‑yearly) (Note: Thereafter Td booster every 10 years with or without vaccination against poliomyelitis (IPV) in case of travel to endemic areas and when previous IPV dose was given more than 5 years before)	
Tetanus			DTaP	DTaP		DTaP			DTaP			Tdap	Td (10‑yearly)	
Pertussis			DTaP	DTaP		DTaP			DTaP			Tdap		
Polio			IPV	IPV		IPV			IPV					
Haemophilus influenzae			HIB	HIB		HIB								
Hepatitis B	HepB													
Pneumococcus			PCV10	PCV10		PCV10								PCV13 + PPSV23 (Note: Recommended but not free of charge for those over 65 years.)
Measles						MMR (Note: Vaccination can be given from 6 months of age in case of travel abroad. If vaccination starts before 12 months of age, 2 doses are recommended (14–18 months and 6 years) The temporary recommendation of giving measles at 12 months of age was made a permanent recommendation; ie. now MMR should be given from 12–18 months except if travelling abroad to measles infected countries when it can be given from 6 months on. In case MMR is given at 6–11 months, the child needs a second and third dose to complete the series.)				MMRV				
Mumps						MMR				MMRV				
Rubella						MMR				MMRV				
Varicella (Note: Varicella vaccination implemented from 1 September 2017. Catch-up to all those born on 1 January 2006 or after and with no history of varicella.)							VV			MMRV				
Human papillomavirus											HPV			
Influenza					IIV3 (Note: One or two doses administered depending on previous influenza vaccination history. Annual vaccination. IIV tri-or quadrivalent used as follows: IIV3 for all those 6–35 months. IIV4 with nonpreferential alternative to all those 24–35 months. IIV3 also recommended to medical risk group children from 36 months up.)									IIV3
Tick-borne encephalitis								TBE (Note: TBE vaccination for to those living permanently on the island of Åland)						

History
1960: Mumps vaccinations for military recruits.
1975: Measles vaccination for 1 year old children.
1975: Rubella vaccination for 11–13 years old girls and seronegative mothers.
1982: Two doses of MMR vaccination at 14–18 months and 6 years of age were introduced in the national childhood vaccination programme.
2009: Rotavirus vaccine introduced at 2, 3 and 5 months to all children (September 2009)
2010: PCV introduced at 3, 5 and 12 months of age to all children (September 2010).
2013: HPV vaccination of girls introduced
2017: Varicella vaccination introduced (1 September 2017) at 18 months, 6 years + catch-up of all born from 1 January 2006 or after with no history of varicella.
2020: HPV vaccination of boys introduced

=== France ===
Vaccination Schedule for France
Infection	Months											Years						
Infection	0	1	2	4	6	11	12	13	15	16–18	23	2	5	6	11–13	25	45	65+
Tuberculosis	BCG†		BCG#															
Diphtheria			D†	D†		D†								D†	D†	d†		
Tetanus			TT†	TT†		TT†								TT†		TT†		
Pertussis			acP†	acP†		acP†								acP†		acp†		
Polio			IPV†	IPV†		IPV†								IPV†		IPV†		
Haemophilus influenzae			Hib†	Hib†		Hib†												
Hepatitis B	HepB†	HepB†	HepB†	HepB†	HepB†													
Pneumococcus			PCV†	PCV†		PCV†												
Meningococcus							MenC†											
Measles					MEAS†					MEAS†								
Mumps							MUMPS†			MUMPS†								
Rubella							RUMBE†			RUMBE†								
Human papillomavirus															HPV†			
Influenza																		TIV†
Herpes Zoster																		HZ†
† General Recommendation # Recommended for specific groups only. ‡ Catch-up

=== Germany ===
In Germany, a vaccination schedule is developed by the Standing Committee on Vaccination (STIKO), which operates as part of the Robert Koch Institute. The recommendations are generally adopted by the Federal Joint Committee.

Vaccination Schedule for Germany
Infection	Weeks	Months								Years								
Infection	6	2	3	4	11	12	14	15	23	2	5–6	9	14	15	17	18–45	59	>60
Rotavirus	RV†	RV†	RV†															
Diphtheria		D†	D†	D†	D†			D‡		d‡	d†	d†				d†		
Tetanus		TT†	TT†	TT†	TT†			TT‡		TT‡	TT†	TT†				TT†		
Pertussis		acP†	acP†	acP†	acP†			acP‡		acP‡	acp†	acp†				acp†		
Polio		IPV†	IPV†	IPV†	IPV†			IPV‡		IPV‡		IPV†				IPV‡		
Haemophilus influenzae		Hib†	Hib†	Hib†	Hib†			Hib‡		Hib‡								
Hepatitis B		HepB†	HepB†	HepB†	HepB†			HepB‡		HepB‡								
Pneumococcus		PCV†	PCV†	PCV†	PCV†			PCV‡			Pnc#							PPSV23†
Meningococcus						MenC†				MenC‡								
Measles					MEAS†			MEAS†		MEAS‡						MEAS#		
Mumps					MUMPS†			MUMPS†		MUMPS‡								
Rubella					RUMBE†			RUMBE†		RUMBE‡								
Varicella					VAR†			VAR†		VAR‡								
Human papillomavirus												HPV†		HPV‡				
Influenza																		TIV†
Tick-borne Encephalitis						TBE#												
† General Recommendation # Recommended for specific groups only. ‡ Catch-up

=== Hong Kong ===
In Hong Kong, Department of Health is responsible for providing free vaccinations from newborns up to primary school students.

=== India ===
In India, the standard vaccination schedule is recommended by the Indian Academy of Paediatrics(IAP). The latest schedule was the one given in 2016.

IAP Immunization Timetable: 2016
Infection	Birth	Months										Years		
Infection	Birth	1.5	2.5	3.5	6	9	9–12	12	15	16–18	18	2	4–6	10–12
Tuberculosis	BCG													
Polio	OPV				OPV	OPV							OPV	
Hepatitis B	HepB	HepB			HepB									
Rotavirus		RV	RV	RV										
Diphtheria		DTwP	DTwP	DTwP						DTwP			DTwP	Tdap
Tetanus		DTwP	DTwP	DTwP						DTwP			DTwP	Tdap
Pertussis		DTwP	DTwP	DTwP						DTwP			DTwP	Tdap
Haemophilus influenzae		HIB	HIB	HIB						HIB				
Pneumococcus		PCV	PCV	PCV					PCV					
Polio		IPV	IPV	IPV						IPV				
Measles						MMR			MMR				MMR	
Mumps						MMR			MMR				MMR	
Rubella						MMR			MMR				MMR	
Typhoid							TCV					TCV		
Hepatitis A								HepA			HepA			
Varicella									VV				VV	
Human papillomavirus														HPV (girls)

=== Italy ===
Vaccination Schedule for Italy
Infection	Birth	Months					Years		
Infection	Birth	3	5–6	11	13	15	5–6	11–18	65+
Diphtheria		D†	D†	D†			D†	d†	
Tetanus		TT†	TT†	TT†			TT†	TT†	
Pertussis		acP†	acP†	acP†			acP†	acp†	
Polio		IPV†	IPV†	IPV†			IPV†		
Haemophilus influenzae		Hib†	Hib†	Hib†					
Hepatitis B	HepB#	HepB†	HepB†	HepB†					
Pneumococcus		PCV†	PCV†	PCV†					
Meningococcus					MenC†			MenC‡	
Measles					MEAS†		MEAS†	MEAS‡	
Mumps					MUMPS†		MUMPS†	MUMPS‡	
Rubella					RUMBE†		RUMBE†	RUMBE‡	
Varicella								VAR†	
Human papillomavirus								HPV†	
Influenza									TIV†
† General Recommendation # Recommended for specific groups only. ‡ Catch-up

=== Japan ===
The vaccination schedule in Japan is defined and partially recommended by Immunization Act (Japanese: 予防接種法) and its related cabinet order (Japanese: 予防接種法施行令). By the combined laws, infections are categorized into two groups: Category A is recommended for vaccination to prevent pandemic whereas Category B is only for a personal care purpose. As of January 2020, fourteen infections are Category A diseases and two are Category B on the legal lists. The Act and the Order were enacted for mandatory vaccination in 1948 with punitive clauses, only the clauses were repealed in 1976 and eventually vaccination has become non-mandatory since 1994.

Japan Vaccine Schedule: January 2020
Infection	Act/ Order (Category)	Birth	Months							Years								
Infection	Act/ Order (Category)	Birth	2	3	6	12	24	36	60	≧5 (Note: Vaccines for measles and rubella (MR vaccine) can be received anytime from 5 y/o before 7 y/o, AND the time should be also between one year and one day before the first day of schooling (quote: "五歳以上七歳未満の者であって、小学校就学の始期に達する日の一年前の日から当該始期に達する日の前日までの間にあるもの".)	7>	7.5 (90 mo)	9	11	12 (Note: HPV for female students only. Vaccination can be started from the first day of school year within she turns 12, and until the last day of school year within she turns 16 (quote: "十二歳となる日の属する年度の初日から十六歳となる日の属する年度の末日までの間にある女子").)	13>	16	60–64 (Note: Age 60–64 with certain diseases: heart, kidney or respitory failures, or with an immune-related disorder due to HIV infection.) & 65+
Diphtheria	Act (A)			DTaP-IPV										DT				
Tetanus	Act (A)			DTaP-IPV										DT				
Pertussis	Act (A)			DTaP-IPV														
Polio	Act (A)			DTaP-IPV														
Measles	Act (A)					MR (1st)				MR (2nd)								
Rubella	Act (A)					MR (1st)				MR (2nd)								
Japanese encephalitis	Act (A)				Japanese encephalitis (1st)								Japanese encephalitis (2nd)					
Tuberculosis	Act (A)	BCG																
Haemophilus influenzae	Act (A)		Hib															
Pneumococcus	Act (A)		Pneumococcal															
Pneumococcus	Order (B)																	Pneumococcal
Human papillomavirus	Act (A)														HPV vaccine			
Smallpox	Order (A)	Not specified by the act or the order																
Varicella	Order (A)					Varicella												
Hepatitis B	Order (A)	Hep B																
Influenza	Order (B)																	Flu

Only in the legal term in Japan, citizens get old one day before their birthdays. If a person was born on January 1, 2020, and Immunization Act specifies vaccine against measles could be received from age 12 months to 24 months, vaccination shall be practiced between December 31, 2020, and December 31, 2021 (not between January 2021 and January 2022.) Some vaccinations are scheduled in line with the school year system, which starts from April 1 in Japan. As explained, those who are born on April 1 and on April 2 get old legally on March 31 and April 1, respectively. Thus, these two people are in different school years and thereby they may take vaccines in different calendar years.

Legal age counting system in Japan
Recipients	Birth	Months							Years							
Recipients	Birth	2	3	6	12	24	36	60	≧5 (Note: Vaccines for measles and rubella (MR vaccine) can be received anytime from 5 y/o before 7 y/o, AND the time should be also between one year and one day before the first day of schooling (quote: "五歳以上七歳未満の者であって、小学校就学の始期に達する日の一年前の日から当該始期に達する日の前日までの間にあるもの".)	7>	7.5 (90 mo)	9	11	12 (Note: HPV for female students only. Vaccination can be started from the first day of school year within she turns 12, and until the last day of school year within she turns 16 (quote: "十二歳となる日の属する年度の初日から十六歳となる日の属する年度の末日までの間にある女子").)	13>	16
Person A (Note: Starts elementary schooling from April 1, 2026)	Dec 31, 2019	Feb 29, 2020 (Note: 2020 is a leap year. Person B socially turns 2 months old on March 1, 2004. In the legal term, however, Person B's 2-month birthday is the day before March 1, 2004. Thus, It shall be February 29, 2004. There are no February 30 or 31 in 2020. As a result Person A and Person B have the same 2-month birthday.)	Mar 30, 2020	Jun 30, 2020	Dec 30, 2020	Dec 30, 2021	Dec 30, 2022	Dec 30, 2024	Apr 1, 2025	Mar 31, 2026	Jun 30, 2027	Dec 30, 2028	Dec 30, 2030	Apr 1, 2031	Dec 29, 2032	Mar 31, 2036
Person B	Jan 1, 2020	Feb 29, 2020	Mar 31, 2020	Jun 30, 2020	Dec 31, 2020	Dec 31, 2021	Dec 31, 2022	Dec 31, 2024	Apr 1, 2025	Mar 31, 2026	Jun 30, 2027	Dec 31, 2028	Dec 31, 2030	Apr 1, 2031	Dec 30, 2032	Mar 31, 2036
Person C	Apr 1, 2020	May 31, 2020	Jun 31, 2020	Sep 30, 2020	Mar 31, 2021	Mar 31, 2022	Mar 31, 2023	Mar 31, 2025	Apr 1, 2025	Mar 31, 2026	Sep 30, 2027	Mar 31, 2029	Mar 31, 2031	Apr 1, 2031	Mar 30, 2033	Mar 31, 2036
Person D (Note: Starts elementary schooling from April 1, 2027)	Apr 2, 2020	Jun 1, 2020	Jul 1, 2020	Oct 1, 2020	Apr 1, 2021	Apr 1, 2022	Apr 1, 2023	Apr 1, 2025	Apr 1, 2026	Mar 31, 2027	Oct 1, 2027	Apr 1, 2029	Apr 1, 2031	Apr 1, 2032	Mar 31, 2033	Mar 31, 2037

=== New Zealand ===
New Zealand Immunization Schedule: 1 March 2023
Infection	Gestation	Birth	Weeks	Months				Years				
Infection	Gestation	Birth	6	3	5	12	15	4	11–12	13–25	45	65+
Tuberculosis		BCG# (Note: For children at high risk of tuberculosis)										
Rotavirus			RV	RV								
Diphtheria	Tdap		DTaP-HepB-IPV-Hib	DTaP-HepB-IPV-Hib	DTaP-HepB-IPV-Hib			DTaP-IPV	Tdap		Tdap	Tdap
Tetanus	Tdap		DTaP-HepB-IPV-Hib	DTaP-HepB-IPV-Hib	DTaP-HepB-IPV-Hib			DTaP-IPV	Tdap		Tdap	Tdap
Pertussis	Tdap		DTaP-HepB-IPV-Hib	DTaP-HepB-IPV-Hib	DTaP-HepB-IPV-Hib			DTaP-IPV	Tdap		Tdap	Tdap
Polio			DTaP-HepB-IPV-Hib	DTaP-HepB-IPV-Hib	DTaP-HepB-IPV-Hib			DTaP-IPV				
Hepatitis B		HepB + HBIG# (Note: For babies of Hepatitis B carrier mothers)	DTaP-HepB-IPV-Hib	DTaP-HepB-IPV-Hib	DTaP-HepB-IPV-Hib							
Haemophilus influenzae			DTaP-HepB-IPV-Hib	DTaP-HepB-IPV-Hib	DTaP-HepB-IPV-Hib		Hib					
Pneumococcus			PCV13	PCV13# (Note: For children at high risk of pneumococcal disease)	PCV13	PCV13						
Meningococcus				MenB	MenB	MenB				MenACWY + MenB# (Note: For adolescents and young adults in communal living environments (e.g. boarding schools and university halls of residence))		
Measles						MMR	MMR					
Mumps						MMR	MMR					
Rubella						MMR	MMR					
Varicella							VV		VV ‡ (Note: For children who have not previously received the varicella vaccine or had a varicella infection)			
Human papillomavirus									HPV9			
Herpes Zoster												HZ
Influenza	IIV					IIV# (yearly) (Note: For people who have certain chronic health conditions, have a history of serious respiratory illness in early childhood, or are receiving care for serious mental health conditions.)						IIV (yearly)
General Recommendation # Recommended for specific groups only. ‡ Catch-up

History

Major additions, replacements and removals from the New Zealand Immunization Schedule include:

1958: First Schedule: DTwP and DT
1961: Polio (OPV) added
1971: Measles, rubella and tetanus toxoid added
1979: Rubella changed to girls only
1988: HepB added
1990: MMR replaced measles and rubella
1994: HIB added; Td replaced tetanus toxoid
1996: DT dropped
1997: Influenza added
2000: DTaP replaced DTwP
2002: IPV replaced OPV
2006: MeNZB and Tdap added
2008: MeNZB dropped, PCV7 added, HPV4 added for females only
2011: PCV10 replaced PCV7
2014: RV5 added, PCV13 replaced PCV10
2017: HPV9 replaced HPV4 and extended to males, RV1 replaced RV5, PCV10 replaced PCV13, VV added.
2018: HZ added.
2020: Td dropped.

=== Nigeria ===
All recommended vaccines are provide free of charge by the Federal Ministry of Health.

Nigerian National Vaccination Schedule:
Infection	Birth	Months						Years	
Infection	Birth	2	3	4	6	9	18	4	5
Tuberculosis	BCG								
Leprosy	BCG								
Hepatitis B	HepB	5V		5V	5V				
Diphtheria		5V		5V	5V		DTP		
Tetanus		5V		5V	5V		DTP		
Pertussis		5V		5V	5V		DTP		
Haemophilus influenzae		5V		5V	5V				
Polio	OPV	OPV	OPV	OPV			OPV	OPV	
Pneumococcus		PCV	PCV	PCV		PCV			
Meningococcus							MCV	MCV	
Yellow fever						YF			

=== Spain ===
Vaccination Schedule for Spain
Infection	Birth	Months					Years				
Infection	Birth	2	4	6	12	18	3–4	6	12	14	65+
Diphtheria		D†	D†	D†		D†		d†		d†	d†
Tetanus		TT†	TT†	TT†		TT†		TT†		TT†	TT†
Pertussis		acP†	acP†	acP†		acP†		acp†			
Polio		IPV†	IPV†	IPV†		IPV†					
Haemophilus influenzae		Hib†	Hib†	Hib†		Hib†					
Hepatitis B	HepB†	HepB†	HepB†								
Pneumococcus		PCV†	PCV†		PCV†						PPSV23†
Meningococcus		MenC†			MenC†				MenC†		
Measles					MEAS†		MEAS†				
Mumps					MUMPS†		MUMPS†				
Rubella					RUMBE†		RUMBE†				
Varicella									VAR†		
Human papillomavirus									HPV†		
Influenza											TIV†
† General Recommendation # Recommended for specific groups only. ‡ Catch-up

=== United Kingdom ===
The United Kingdom childhood vaccination schedule is recommended by the Department of Health and National Health Service, and uses combination immunisations where available.

United Kingdom Vaccine Schedule: 2020
Infection	Months				Years				
Infection	2	3	4	12	2–10	3–4	12–13	13–15	16–18
Diphtheria	DTaP	DTaP	DTaP			DTaP		Td	
Tetanus	DTaP	DTaP	DTaP			DTaP		Td	
Pertussis	DTaP	DTaP	DTaP			DTaP			
Polio	IPV	IPV	IPV			IPV		IPV	
Haemophilus influenzae	HIB	HIB	HIB	HIB					
Meningococcus	MenB		MenB	MenB/C				MenACWY	
Rotavirus	RV	RV							
Pneumococcus		PCV		PCV					
Hepatitis B	HepB	HepB	HepB						
Measles				MMR		MMR			
Mumps				MMR		MMR			
Rubella				MMR		MMR			
Influenza					LAIV				
HPV							HPVx2		

==== Non-routine vaccinations ====
Some children may receive vaccines in addition to those listed in the table:

- BCG vaccine is given at birth to "children born in areas of the country where there are high numbers of TB cases" and "children whose parents or grandparents were born in a country with many cases of TB."
- Hepatitis B vaccine is given at birth to "babies born to mothers who have hepatitis B".
- The injected flu vaccine is offered annually to "children 6 months to 17 years old with long-term health conditions".

==== Adult vaccinations ====
The five scheduled childhood tetanus vaccinations are thought to generally confer lifelong immunity; thus, no routine booster doses are given in adulthood. Those adults at risk of contaminated cuts (e.g., gardeners) may have booster tetanus vaccination every ten years. Pneumococcus vaccinations (pneumococcal polysaccharide vaccine/PPV) are recommended for those over 65 and for people without a functional spleen (asplenia), either because the spleen has been removed or does not work properly. Flu vaccine is recommended for anyone who is aged 65 years and over, people with certain long-term medical conditions, health and social care professionals, pregnant women, and poultry workers. The shingles vaccine is recommended for those over 70. Additionally, pregnant women are advised to have the pertussis vaccine.

=== United States ===
The most up-to-date schedules are available from CDC's National Center for Immunization and Respiratory Diseases. In the US, the National Childhood Vaccine Injury Act requires all health-care providers to provide parents or patients with copies of Vaccine Information Statements before administering vaccines.

Vaccine Schedule for the United States: 2020
Infection	Birth	Months									Years										
Infection	Birth	1	2	4	6	9	12	15	18	19–23	2–3	4–6	7–10	11–12	13–15	16	17–18	19–26	27–49	50–64	65+
Hepatitis B	HepB†	HepB†		HepB‡	HepB†					HepB‡								HepB x2–3#			
Rotavirus			RV†	RV†	RV†																
Diphtheria			DTaP†	DTaP†	DTaP†	DTaP‡		DTaP†		DTaP‡		DTaP†	Tdap‡	Tdap†	Tdap‡			Td or Tdap (every 10 years)†			
Tetanus			DTaP†	DTaP†	DTaP†	DTaP‡		DTaP†		DTaP‡		DTaP†	Tdap‡	Tdap†	Tdap‡			Td or Tdap (every 10 years)†			
Pertussis			DTaP†	DTaP†	DTaP†	DTaP‡		DTaP†		DTaP‡		DTaP†	Tdap‡	Tdap†	Tdap‡			Td or Tdap (every 10 years)†			
Haemophilus influenzae			Hib†	Hib†	Hib†	Hib‡	Hib†		Hib‡				Hib#					Hib x1–3#			
Polio			IPV†	IPV†	IPV†					IPV‡		IPV†	IPV‡								
Pneumococcus			PCV13†	PCV13†	PCV13†	PCV13‡	PCV13†		PCV13‡				PCV13#					PCV13#			PCV13§
Pneumococcus											PPSV23#							PPSV23 x1–2#			PPSV23†
Influenza					IIV (yearly)†						IIV or LAIV (yearly)†										
Measles					MMR#		MMR†		MMR‡			MMR†	MMR‡					MMR x1–2‡			
Mumps					MMR#		MMR†		MMR‡			MMR†	MMR‡					MMR x1–2‡			
Rubella					MMR#		MMR†		MMR‡			MMR†	MMR‡					MMR x1–2‡			
Varicella							VAR†		VAR‡			VAR†	VAR‡					VAR x1–2‡		VAR 2x#	
Hepatitis A					HepA#		HepA x2†				HepA‡							HepA x2–3#			
Meningococcus			MenACWY#											MenACWY†	MenACWY‡	MenACWY†	MenACWY‡	MenACWY x1–2#			
Meningococcus														MenB x2–3#							
Meningococcus																	MenB§				
Human papillomavirus													HPV#	HPV x2–3†	HPV‡			HPV‡	HPV§		
Herpes Zoster																				RZV or ZVL†	
† Range of recommended ages for everyone. See references for more details.; # Range of recommended ages for certain high-risk groups. See references for more details.; ‡ Range of recommended ages for catch-up immunization or for people who lack evidence of immunity (e.g., lack documentation of vaccination or have no evidence of prior infection). (Note: CDC provides more detailed information in catch-up immunizations.); § Recommended vaccination based on shared clinical decision-making.

==== During pregnancy ====
The CDC recommends pregnant women receive some vaccines, such as the measles, mumps, rubella (MMR) vaccine a month or more before pregnancy. The Tdap vaccine (to help protect against whooping cough) is recommended during pregnancy. Other vaccines, like the flu shot, can be given before or during pregnancy, depending on whether or not it is flu season. Vaccination is safe right after giving birth, even while breastfeeding.

== History ==
In 1900, the smallpox vaccine was the only one administered to children. By the early 1950s, children routinely received three vaccines, for protection against diphtheria, pertussis, tetanus, and smallpox, and as many as five shots by two years of age. Since the mid-1980s, many vaccines have been added to the schedule. In 2009, the U.S. Centers for Disease Control and Prevention (CDC) recommended vaccination against at least fourteen diseases. By two years of age, U.S. children receive as many as 24 vaccine injections, and might receive up to five shots during one visit to the doctor. The use of combination vaccine products means that, as of 2013, the United Kingdom's immunization program consists of nine injections by the age of two, rather than 22 if vaccination for each disease was given as a separate injection.

Vaccination has saved over 154 million lives in the past 50 years.

== See also ==
- Vaccination policy
- Influenza vaccine
- H5N1 clinical trials
- 2009 flu pandemic vaccine
- COVID-19 vaccine
