= Vaccination in Brazil =

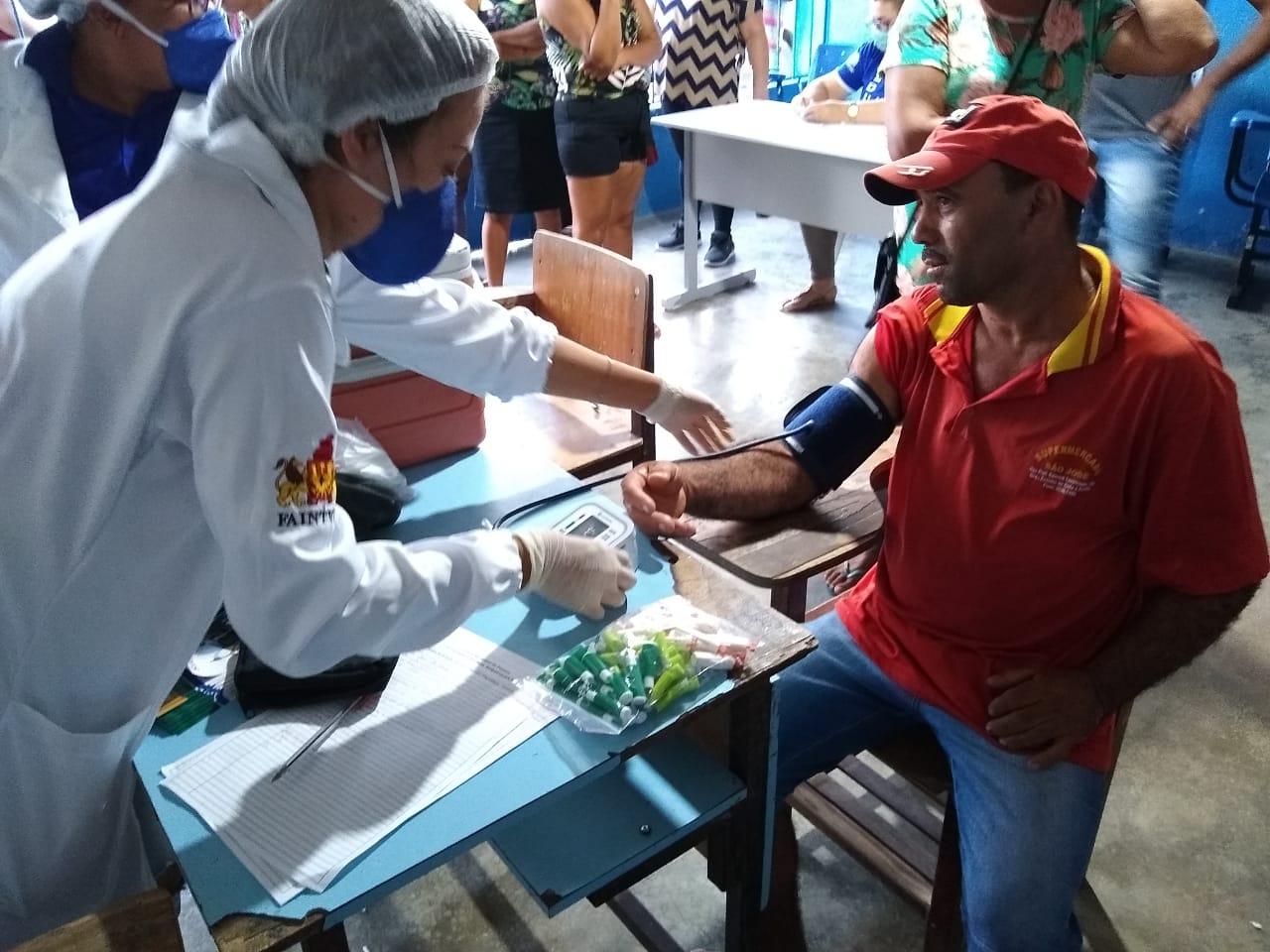
Vaccination campaign in Passira, state of Pernambuco, in 2020

Vaccination in Brazil is the practice of giving vaccines, biological preparations that provide active acquired immunity to particular infectious or malignant diseases, in Brazil.

The National Program for Immunization (Programa Nacional de Imunizações, or PNI) of the Unified Health System is the national government agency overseeing vaccination in Brazil. Historically coverage has been high, reaching a national rate higher than 90%.

Brazil has an established pool of scientists and doctors who are prepared to do vaccine research and development. The COVID-19 pandemic in Brazil had the effect of providing Brazil an opportunity to conduct some of the world's most important COVID-19 vaccine research.

As of November 2021, Brazil has the lowest level of vaccine hesitancy in Latin America. Experts ascribe this to long-standing vaccination programs run by the public health system and to the inclusion of a vaccination requirement in social welfare programs. At the same time, vaccination coverage has been decreasing since 2011, mainly among rural families and people with low education.

== Routine vaccinations ==
Vaccination coverage includes
For children

1. BCG vaccine, Intradermal, at birth
2. Hepatitis B vaccine, at birth, 1 and 6 months
3. Pentavalent vaccine, DTP (whole cell pertussis component), HB, and Hib, administered at 2, 4, and 6 months, with a booster (DTP) at 15 months and 4 years.
4. Polio vaccine (inactivated), at 2 and 4 months
5. Polio vaccine (oral), at 6 and 15 months
6. Rotavirus vaccine (monovalent oral human rotavirus vaccine) at 2 and 4 months
7. Pneumococcal vaccine 10-valent conjugate vaccine d at 2, 4, 6, and 10 months
8. Yellow fever vaccine at 9 months and booster every 10 years
9. MMR vaccine at 12 months and 4 years
10. Meningococcal vaccine at 3, 5, and 15 months
11. Influenza vaccine, annually
12. MMRV vaccine, after 1 year of age
13. Hepatitis A vaccine, at 0 and 6 to 12 months

For adults:

Seasonal influenza vaccines are freely available once a year for those above 60 years of age, first responders, security personnel, postpartum women and to those with select health conditions. Adults also have access to the Hepatitis B, human papillomavirus (HPV), Yellow Fever and COVID-19 vaccines.

== Economics ==
Since 2008 there has been much more research in Brazil on the economic costs and benefits of vaccination programs. A 2014 study found favorable benefits of the HPV vaccine in Brazil while also explaining that economically the consequences are not simple to explain. A 2012 study considered the financial costs and health benefits of providing hepatitis A vaccines nationally to children in Brazil.

== Other issues ==
A 2020 review of social research on vaccination in Latin America found that about half of the research papers were about Brazil.

A review of meningococcal vaccine use in Brazil from 2005 to 2017 found that the vaccination program lowered the number of cases of the disease while also the number of deaths from the disease did not change much.

In 2018 Brazil began a large campaign to provide about 70 million people with the yellow fever vaccine.
