= Dan M. Granoff =

American physician-scientist

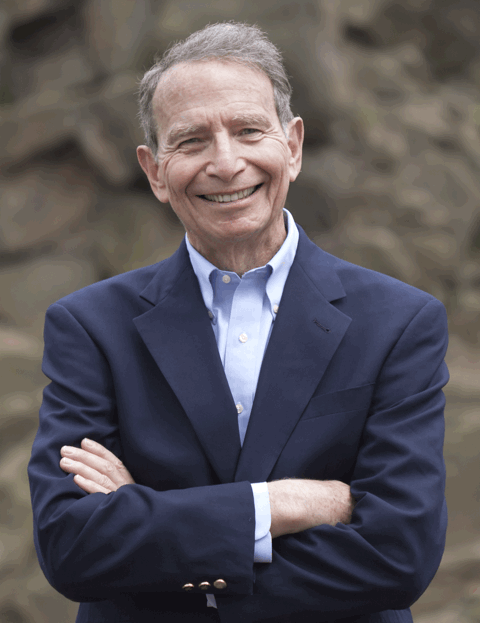

Dan M. Granoff (born January 22, 1944) is an infectious disease physician-scientist who was named the 2014 Maurice Hilleman/Merck Laureate by the American Society for Microbiology for outstanding contributions to vaccine discovery and development. Beginning in 2011, Granoff held the Clorox Foundation Endowed Chair and was director of the Center of Immunobiology and Vaccine Development at Children's Hospital Oakland Research Institute (now known as University of California San Francisco (UCSF) Benioff Children's Hospital Oakland). His work increased understanding of basic mechanisms of human immunity to encapsulated bacteria, and furthered development of vaccines against Haemophilus influenzae type B (Hib) and Neisseria meningitidis (also called the meningococcus).

== Personal life ==
Granoff was born in 1944 in New York City, NY, He divides his time between San Francisco, California, and Carmel Valley, California, with his partner, Marjory A Kaplan, a retired lawyer. He was married to Alice Baghdassarian Granoff, M.D., and divorced in 1985. They have two sons.

== Education ==
Granoff completed his bachelors and medical degrees at Johns Hopkins University, Baltimore Maryland. He completed pediatric residency training at the Johns Hopkins Hospital, followed by a post-doctoral fellowship in pediatric infectious diseases at Case Western Reserve University School of Medicine, Cleveland Metropolitan General Hospital (now MetroHealth Medical Center).

== Research ==
Described below are some of Granoff's most important research contributions.

=== Development of Haemophilus influenzae type b (Hib) polysaccharide and polysaccharide-protein conjugate vaccines ===
In 1987, the first Hib conjugate vaccine, which used Hib capsular polysaccharide (called PRP) conjugated to diphtheria toxoid as the carrier protein, was licensed in the United States and recommended for the age group 18 to 60 months. Granoff and colleagues were the first to test this vaccine in humans. In subsequent studies with Dr. Trudy Virginia Noller Murphy then at Southwestern Medical School in Dallas TX, and Dr. Michael Osterholm, then at the Minnesota Department of Health, they demonstrated that the vaccine, called PRP-D, not only decreased Hib disease in vaccinated children but also in children in the age group less than 18 months, which at the time was not being vaccinated. This study was one of the first to suggest that introduction of a polysaccharide-protein conjugate vaccine could lead to "herd immunity", now also called "community protection" or "community immunity").

Granoff and his colleagues also demonstrated an unexpected decrease in the presence of Hib in the noses and throats of healthy children who had been immunized with PRP-D, when compared to unvaccinated children or children who had been vaccinated with an earlier Hib vaccine containing only unconjugated polysaccharide. This finding provided a basis for the observed community protection against Hib disease in unvaccinated infants (because of decreased exposure).

=== Insights into the molecular basis of human anticapsular immunity ===
In 1986 Granoff and his colleagues reported that a single injection of a modified Hib conjugate vaccine that used an meningococcal outer membrane complex as its carrier protein elicited a protective antibody response in two month-old infants. This result was unexpected since scientists at the time believed that two-month-olds did not have mature B cells capable of responding to polysaccharide antigens. Granoff's findings, which were subsequently confirmed by others, proved that B cells, with the appropriate rearranged genes, were present at age two months and were activated by a single injection of this Hib polysaccharide conjugate vaccine. The presence of a meningococcal porin protein (called PorB) as part of the carrier protein likely provided unique adjuvant and immunostimulatory signals. The adjuvant activity helps explain the unique ability of this Hib vaccine (now called PedVaxHib) to be immunogenic in 2 month olds after a single injection.

With Dr. Alexander H. Lucas, Granoff also used idiotype analysis to investigate variable region gene diversity in human antibodies for Hib polysaccharide. They found dramatic changes in gene utilization by age of vaccination, and different Hib conjugate vaccine types. Collectively these studies contributed to making anti-Hib capsular antibodies one of the best understood human antibody systems at a molecular level.

=== A meningococcal serogroup A conjugate vaccine for Sub-Saharan Africa ===
For much of the 20th century, Sub-Saharan Africa experienced large epidemics of meningococcal disease caused by serogroup A strains. By the mid-1990s, three vaccine manufacturers were developing meningococcal conjugate vaccines against serogroup C strains in response to public health concerns in the United Kingdom resulting from approximately 10,000 cases and 1000 deaths during the previous decade. However, because of poor prospects for a profit, there was little interest by commercial manufacturers to develop a serogroup group A meningococcal conjugate vaccine for use in Sub-Saharan Africa where, during the same time period, there were more than 700,000 cases and 100,000 deaths. In 1999, Granoff, working with colleagues at the World Health Organization, proposed developing and manufacturing a low cost, meningococcal vaccine for Africa using a public–private partnership. With funding by the Bill and Melinda Gates Foundation, and under the leadership of Dr. Marc LaForce, a low cost, vaccine, called MenAfriVac, was developed and introduced in Sub-Saharan Africa in 2010. By 2015, more than 150 million people had been immunized. The vaccine has been highly effective in preventing group A epidemics and helped establish herd immunity.

=== Meningococcal vaccines that target serogroup B strains ===
The polysaccharide protein conjugate vaccine approach used to develop successful Hib vaccines was subsequently applied to develop vaccines for prevention of meningococcal disease, a severe and often deadly infection of infants and teenagers. These efforts resulted in several licensed conjugate vaccines for prevention of disease caused by meningococcal strains with capsular groups designated A, C, Y and W . However, this approach was not feasible for a vaccine against group B strains, which were the most common cause of meningococcal disease in infants in North America and Europe. The reason was that the group B capsule shares structural features that are similar to sugars present in human tissues. Thus, stimulating antibodies to this bacterial capsule was difficult and if successful risked eliciting autoantibodies that could give rise to autoimmune disease. Granoff, collaborating with Sanjay Ram's Laboratory, then at Boston University School of Medicine, and their colleagues identified a meningococcal lipoprotein that was critical for the ability of the bacteria to survive in human serum. The protein bound human complement factor H (FH), which is present in high concentrations in human serum, and down-regulates complement activation. The lipoprotein, which had been previously identified as a vaccine antigen of unknown function by two groups, had been designated GNA1870 by one group or Lp2086 by another. To reflect its function, Granoff and Ram renamed the lipoprotein "Factor H binding protein" or "FHbp". FHbp is now the main or sole antigen in the two meningococcal group B vaccines licensed in the U.S., Europe and in other areas of the world. In immunized humans, however, the FHbp antigen forms a complex with human FH. With Drs. Peter Beernink and Sanjay Ram, Granoff showed that FH binding to FHbp decreased protective antibody responses. Beernink and Granoff went on to create mutant FHbp vaccines with amino acid substitutions that decreased FH binding, which elicited greater protective antibody responses than antigens that bound FH. They showed that currently licensed FHbp-based meningococcal B vaccines can be improved by introducing these amino acid substitutions. Granoff and his colleagues also investigated over-expressing FHbp in meningococcal native outer membrane vesicles (NOMV) prepared from mutant meningococcal strains. In mice and infant macaque monkeys, the mutant meningococcal NOMV vaccine combined with over-expressing mutant low FH-binding FHbp elicited much higher and broader protective antibody responses than control vaccines, including a currently licensed one.

== Publications ==
Granoff authored or co-authored more than 225 research articles in peer-reviewed journals and review articles, and multiple textbook chapters including recent chapters on meningococcal vaccines published in the 7th and 8th editions of Plotkin's Vaccines. Granoff also co-edited a textbook on Hib vaccines with Dr. Ronald D Ellis. In December 2025 he authored an opinion piece in the San Francisco Chronicle on the risks of abandoning vaccines on return of infectious diseases that phyicians and public health officials worked hard to erase https://www.sfchronicle.com/opinion/openforum/article/measles-mumps-rubella-mmr-autism-rfk-trump-21211320.php

== Academic and Business career ==
Granoff served as Professor of Pediatrics and Director of the Division of Pediatric Infectious Diseases at Washington University School of Medicine and St. Louis Children's Hospital from 1979 to 1993. In 1993, he became Executive Director of Clinical Vaccine Research at Chiron Corporation (Emeryville CA) with a joint appointment as a Scientist at Children's Hospital Oakland Research Institute(Currently UCSF Benioff Children's Hospital)]. His team at Chiron was responsible for clinical development of the first adjuvanted influenza vaccine, and a meningococcal serogroup C conjugate vaccine, which was used to control deadly outbreaks in the United Kingdom. In 1995 Granoff became Vice President of Scientific Affairs. He left Chiron in 1998 to become a Senior Scientist at Children's Hospital Oakland Research Institute. Beginning in 2011, Granoff held the Clorox Foundation Endowed Chair and was Director of the Center of Immunobiology and Vaccine Development until his retirement in 2019.

== Editorship ==
Granoff served as associate editor of the journal, Pediatric Research from 1982 to 1988 and is a member of the editorial boards of Human Vaccines & Immunotherapeutics and the journal Vaccine. He is a member on the editorial advisory board of the journal, Clinical Infectious Diseases.

== Recognition by scientific societies ==
The American Society for Clinical Investigation (ASCI): Elected to membership in 1987

The American Academy of Microbiology: Elected as a Fellow in 2010

The Infectious Diseases Society of America and the Pediatric Infectious Diseases Society: Elected as a Fellow to both organizations.

== Awards ==
- 1981 Alpha Omega Alpha Faculty honoree at Washington University School of Medicine, St. Louis MO
- 2010 Stanley A. Plotkin Awardee in Vaccinology, the Pediatric Infectious Diseases Society Granoff received this award for significant contributions to the field of "vaccinology."
- 2014 Maurice Hilleman/Merck Laureate, the American Society for Microbiology. Granoff received this award for outstanding contributions to vaccine discovery and development.
- 2017 Johns Hopkins School of Medicine Distinguished Medical Alumnus Award

== Patents ==
Granoff is inventor or co-inventor on multiple US and international patents including Patent Nos. US6,936,261; US8,968,748; US9,034,345; US9,439,957; US10,857,221; and US10,905,754 and others.
