= Hib vaccine =

Haemophilus influenzae type B vaccine

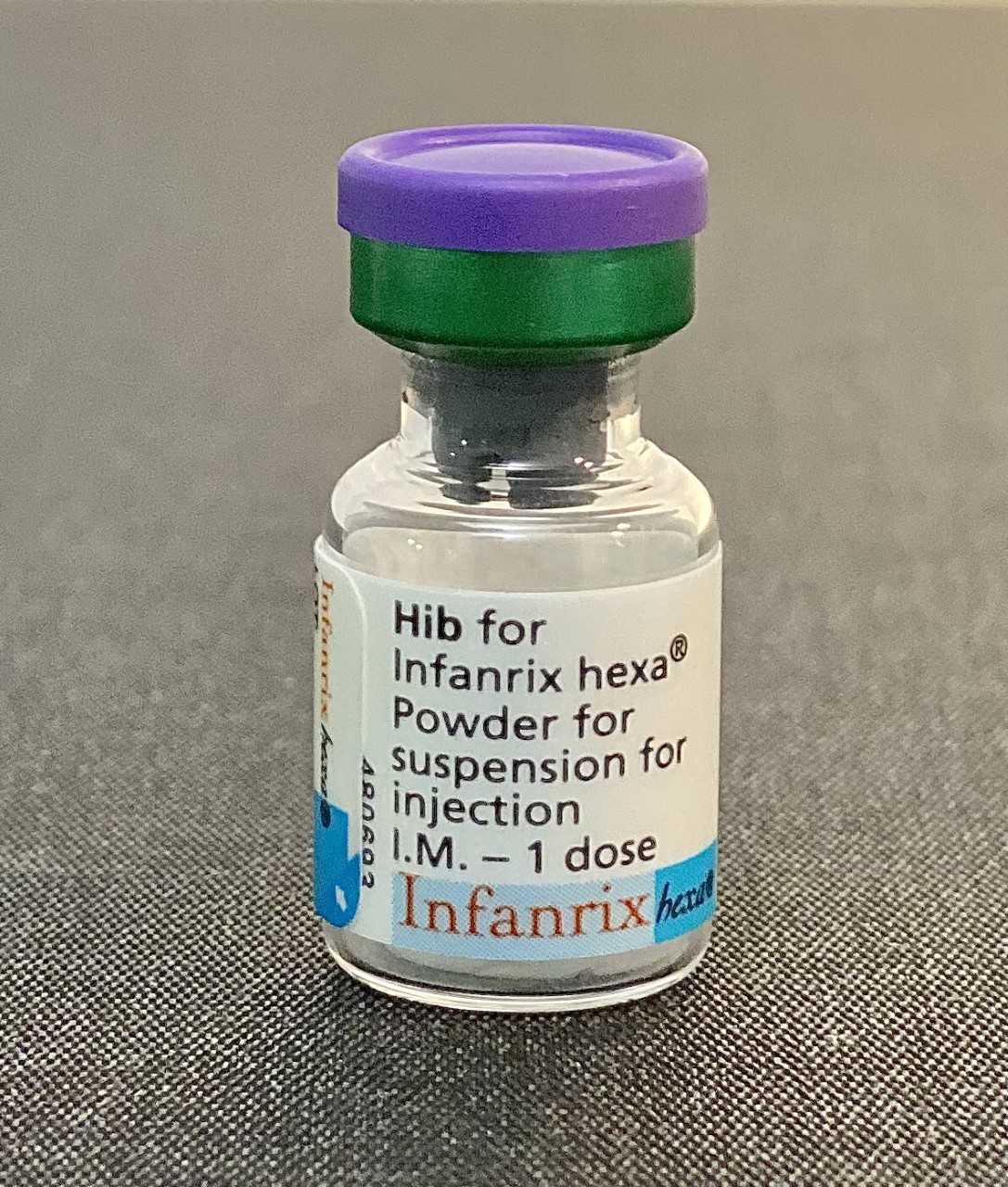
- Hib component of Infanrix hexa

Vaccine description
- Target: Haemophilus influenzae type b
- Vaccine type: Conjugate

Clinical data
- Trade names: ActHIB, Hiberix, OmniHIB, others
- AHFS/Drugs.com: Professional Drug Facts
- MedlinePlus: a607015
- License data: US DailyMed: Haemophilus
- Pregnancy category: AU: B2
- Routes of administration: Intramuscular
- ATC code: J07AG01 (WHO)

Legal status
- Legal status: US: ℞-only

Identifiers
- DrugBank: DB10990; DB10342
- ChemSpider: none
- UNII: C9R35M8XV6; LUY6P8763W

The Haemophilus influenzae type B vaccine, also known as Hib vaccine, is a vaccine used to prevent Haemophilus influenzae type b (Hib) infection. In countries that include it as a routine vaccine, rates of severe Hib infections have decreased more than 90%. It has therefore resulted in a decrease in the rate of meningitis, pneumonia, and epiglottitis.

It is recommended by both the World Health Organization (WHO) and the U.S. Centers for Disease Control and Prevention (CDC). Two or three doses should be given before six months of age. In the United States a fourth dose is recommended between 12 and 15 months of age. The first dose is recommended around six weeks of age with at least four weeks between doses. If only two doses are used, another dose later in life is recommended. It is given by injection into a muscle.

Severe side effects are extremely rare. About 20 to 25% of people develop pain at the site of injection while about 2% develop a fever. There is no clear association with severe allergic reactions. The Hib vaccine is available by itself, in combination with the diphtheria/tetanus/pertussis vaccine, and in combination with the hepatitis B vaccine, among others. All Hib vaccines that are currently used are conjugate vaccine.

An initial Hib vaccine consisting of plain (unconjugated) type b polysaccharide, was introduced in the United States in 1985. but was replaced by a more effective conjugated formulation beginning in 1987. As of 2013, 184 countries include it in their routine vaccinations. It is on the World Health Organization's List of Essential Medicines.

== Medical uses ==
Hib vaccine

Haemophilus influenzae b vaccine immunization schedule

Hib conjugate vaccines are effective against all manifestations of Hib disease, with a clinical efficacy among fully vaccinated children estimated to be between 95–100%. The vaccine has also been shown to be immunogenic in patients at high risk of invasive disease. Hib vaccine is not effective against non-type B Haemophilus influenzae. However, non-type B disease is rare in comparison to pre-vaccine rates of Haemophilus influenzae type B disease.

=== Impact ===
Before the introduction of the conjugate vaccine, Hib was a leading cause of childhood meningitis, pneumonia, and epiglottitis in the United States, causing an estimated 20,000 cases a year in the early 1980s. Nearly all Hib disease was in children under five years old. After routine use of Hib conjugate vaccines in the United States, the rate of invasive Hib disease decreased from 40–100 per 100,000 children down to fewer than 1 per 100,000. Similar reductions in Hib disease occurred after introduction of the vaccine in Western Europe and developing countries. However, in recent years. Haemophilus influenzae strains with other encapsulated serotypes such as a or f, or non-encapsulated strains, have been recognized to cause invasive disease, particularly in high-risk populations.

=== Recommendations ===
The CDC and the WHO recommend that all infants be vaccinated using a polysaccharide-protein conjugate Hib vaccine, starting after the age of six weeks. The vaccination is also indicated in people without a spleen.

== Side effects ==
Clinical trials and ongoing surveillance have shown the Hib vaccine to be safe. In general, adverse reactions to the vaccine are mild. The most common reactions are mild fever, loss of appetite, transient redness, swelling, or pain at the site of injection, occurring in 5–30% of vaccine recipients. More severe reactions are extremely rare.

== Mechanisms of action ==
=== Polysaccharide vaccine ===
Haemophilus influenzae type b is a bacterium with a polysaccharide capsule; the main component of this capsule is polyribosyl ribitol phosphate (PRP). Anti-PRP antibodies have a protective effect against Hib infections. However, the antibody response to PRP was quite variable in young children and diminished rapidly after administration. This problem was due to the recognition of the PRP antigen by B cells, but not T cells. In other words, even though B cell recognition was taking place, T cell recruitment (via MHC class II) was not, which compromised the immune response. This interaction with only B cells is termed T-independent (TI). This process also inhibits the formation of memory B cells, thus compromising long-term immune system memory.

=== Conjugate vaccine ===
PRP covalently linked to a protein carrier was found to elicit a greater immune response than the polysaccharide form of the vaccine. This is due to the protein carrier being highly immunogenic. The conjugate formulations show responses that are consistent with T-cell recruitment (namely a much stronger immune response). A memory effect (priming of the immune system against future attack by Hib) is also observed after administration; indicative that memory B cell formation is also improved over that of the unconjugated polysaccharide form. Since optimal contact between B cells and T cells is required (via MHC II) to maximize antibody production, it is reasoned that the conjugate vaccine allows B cells to properly recruit T cells, this is in contrast to the polysaccharide form in which it is speculated that B cells do not interact optimally with T cells leading to the TI interaction.

== Developing world ==
The introduction of the Hib vaccine in developing countries lagged behind that in developed countries for several reasons. The expense of the vaccine was large in comparison to the standard EPI vaccines. Poor disease surveillance systems and inadequate hospital laboratories failed to detect the disease, leading many experts to believe that Hib did not exist in their countries. And health systems in many countries were struggling with the current vaccines they were trying to deliver.

=== GAVI and the hib initiative ===
In order to remedy these issues, the GAVI Alliance took active interest in the vaccine.

== History ==
=== Polysaccharide vaccine ===
The first Hib vaccine licensed was an unconjugated polysaccharide vaccine, called PRP. This vaccine was first marketed in the United States in 1985. Similar to other unconjugated polysaccharide vaccines, serum antibody responses to PPP vaccine were highly age-dependent. Children under 18 months of age did not produce a positive response to this vaccine. As a result, the age group with the highest incidence of Hib disease was unprotected, limiting the usefulness of the vaccine. Also, post-licensure studies by Michael Osterholm and his colleagues, and Dan M. Granoff et al. suggested that the PRP vaccine was largely ineffective in preventing invasive Hib disease in children 18 to 59 months, the age group recommended for vaccination . The vaccine was withdrawn from the market in 1988.

=== Conjugate vaccine ===
The shortcomings of the polysaccharide vaccine led to the production of the Hib polysaccharide-protein conjugate vaccine. In 1987, the first Hib conjugate vaccine, which used diphtheria toxoid as the carrier protein (PRP-D), was licensed in the U.S. and initially recommended for children ages 18 to 59 months of age. This vaccine was based on work done by Lasker Award-winning American scientists John Robbins and Rachel Schneerson at the U.S. National Institutes of Health, and Porter Anderson and David Smith then at Boston Children's Hospital. Attaching Hib polysaccharide to a protein carrier greatly increased the ability of the immune system of young children to recognize the polysaccharide and develop immunity. In contrast to the unconjugated PRP vaccine, PRP-D vaccines were highly effective in controlling Hib disease in the age group being immunized (18 to 59 months). Unexpectedly, the vaccine also was associated with a dramatic decline in Hib disease in the age group less than 18 months, which at the time was not being vaccinated (evidence of indirect community protection or "herd immunity". Trudy Murphy and her colleagues reported that healthy children in a daycare center who had been immunized with PRP-D had a lower rate of Hib colonization in their noses and throats than healthy unvaccinated children, which was not observed in children vaccinated with unconjugated PRP vaccine. These results explained the ability of PRP-D conjugate vaccine to lower transmission of Hib from conjugate-vaccinated to unvaccinated children, and provide indirect community protection from conjugate vaccination.

There are currently three types of conjugate vaccine, utilizing different carrier proteins for the conjugation process: inactivated tetanospasmin (also called tetanus toxoid); mutant diphtheria protein; and meningococcal group B outer membrane protein. The Hib vaccine using a meningococcal outer membrane carrier protein has unique immunostimulatory properties, eliciting an anticapsular response to a single injection given to infants as young as 2 months of age. In contrast, Hib conjugate vaccines using other protein carriers require two or three injections to reliably elicit anticapsular antibody responses in infants less than six months of age.

=== Combination vaccines ===
Multiple combinations of Hib and other vaccines have been licensed in the United States, reducing the number of injections necessary to vaccinate a child. Hib vaccines combined with diphtheria-tetanus-pertussis–polio vaccines and hepatitis B vaccines are available in the United States. The World Health Organization (WHO) has certified several Hib vaccine combinations, including a pentavalent diphtheria-pertussis-tetanus-hepatitis B-Hib, for use in developing countries. There is not yet sufficient evidence on how effective this combined pentavalent vaccine is compared to the individual vaccines.

=== Decline of vaccinations in United States and impact ===
By 2026, following the decline of vaccinations in the United States, Hib was confirmed to be making a comeback in the country.

== Gallery ==
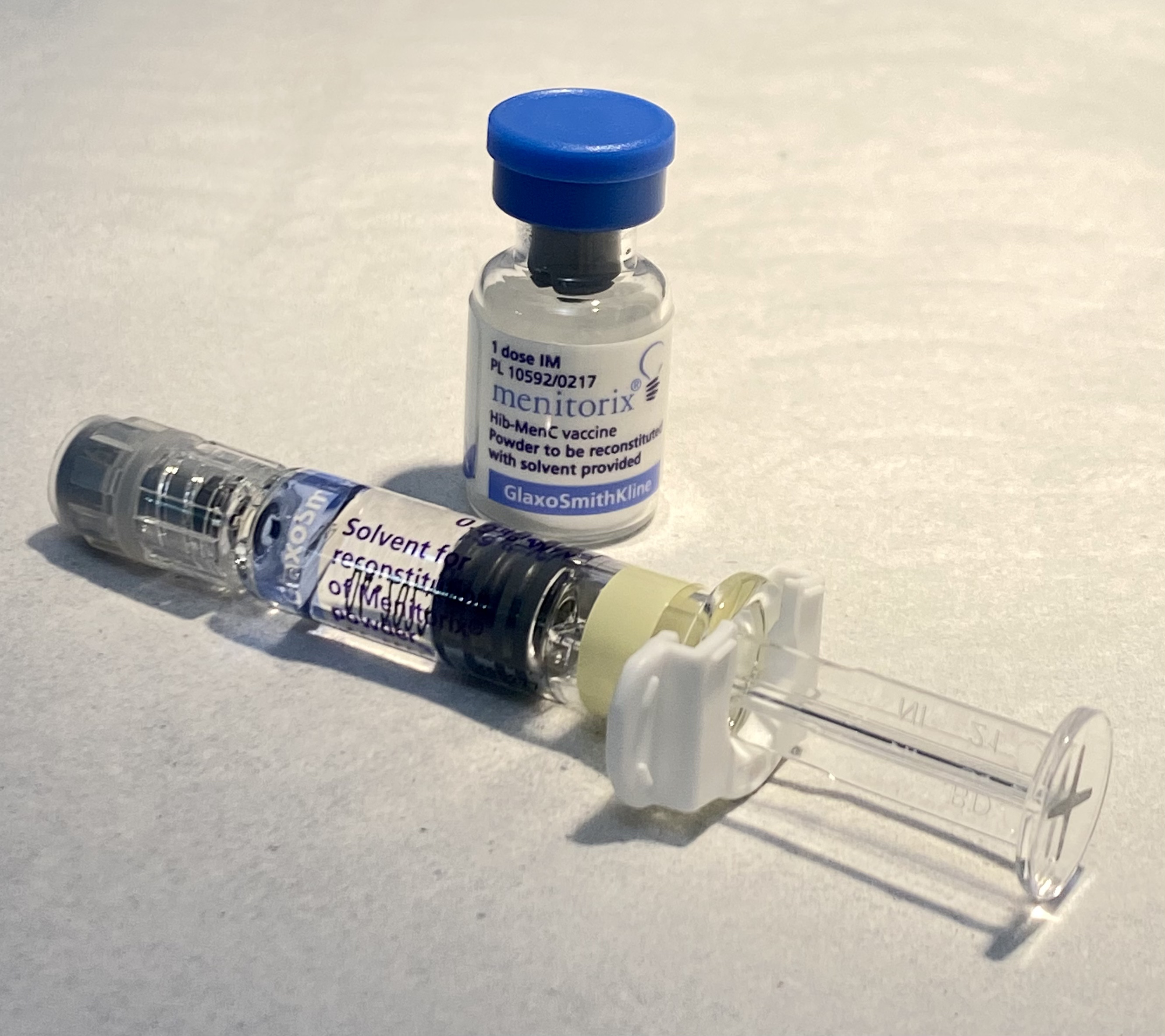
Menitorix: Hib with meningitis C (MenC-Hib)

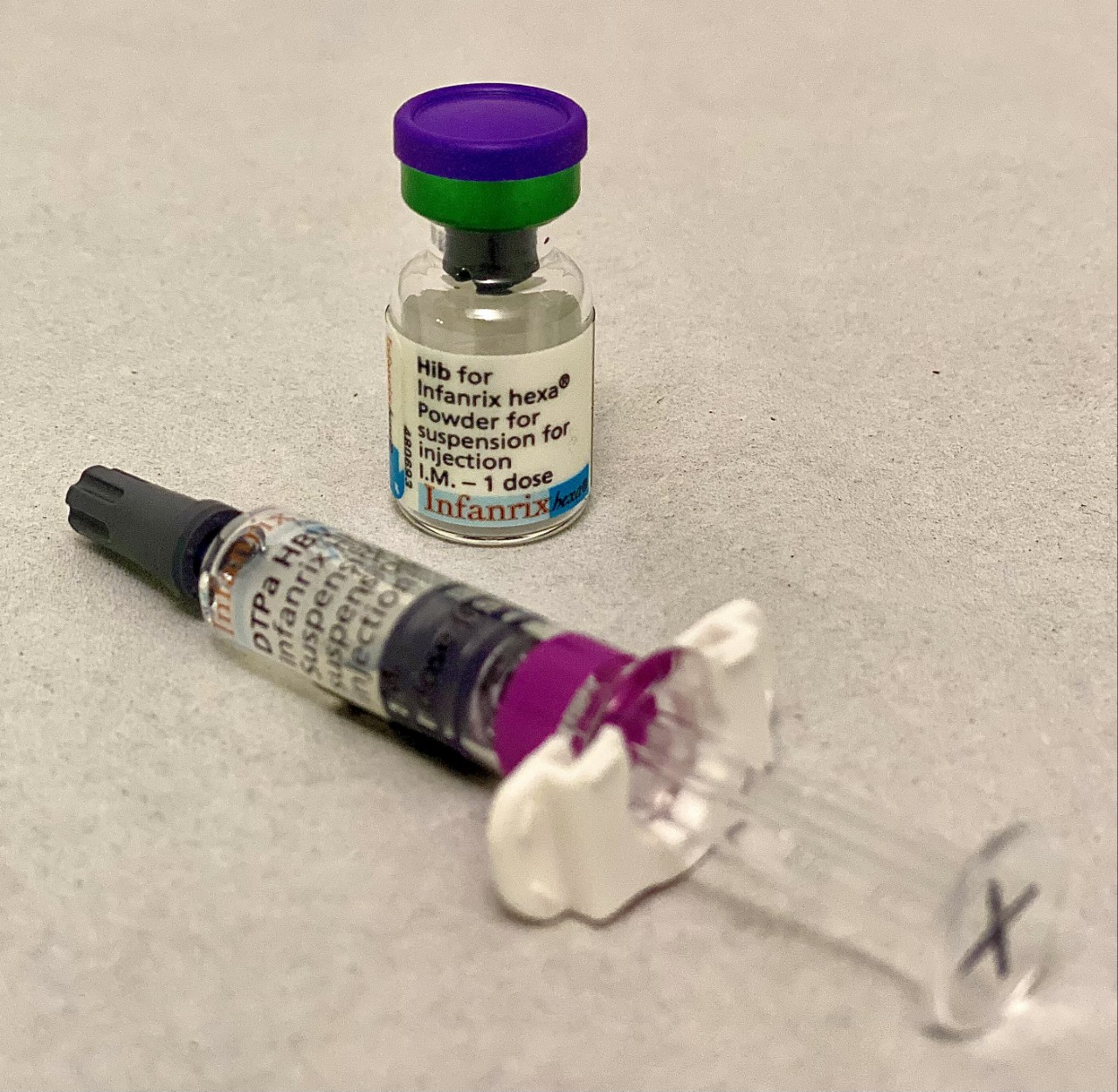
Infanrix hexa: Hib with hepatitis B, diphtheria, tetanus, pertussis and poliomyelitis (DTP-IPV-HBV-Hib)

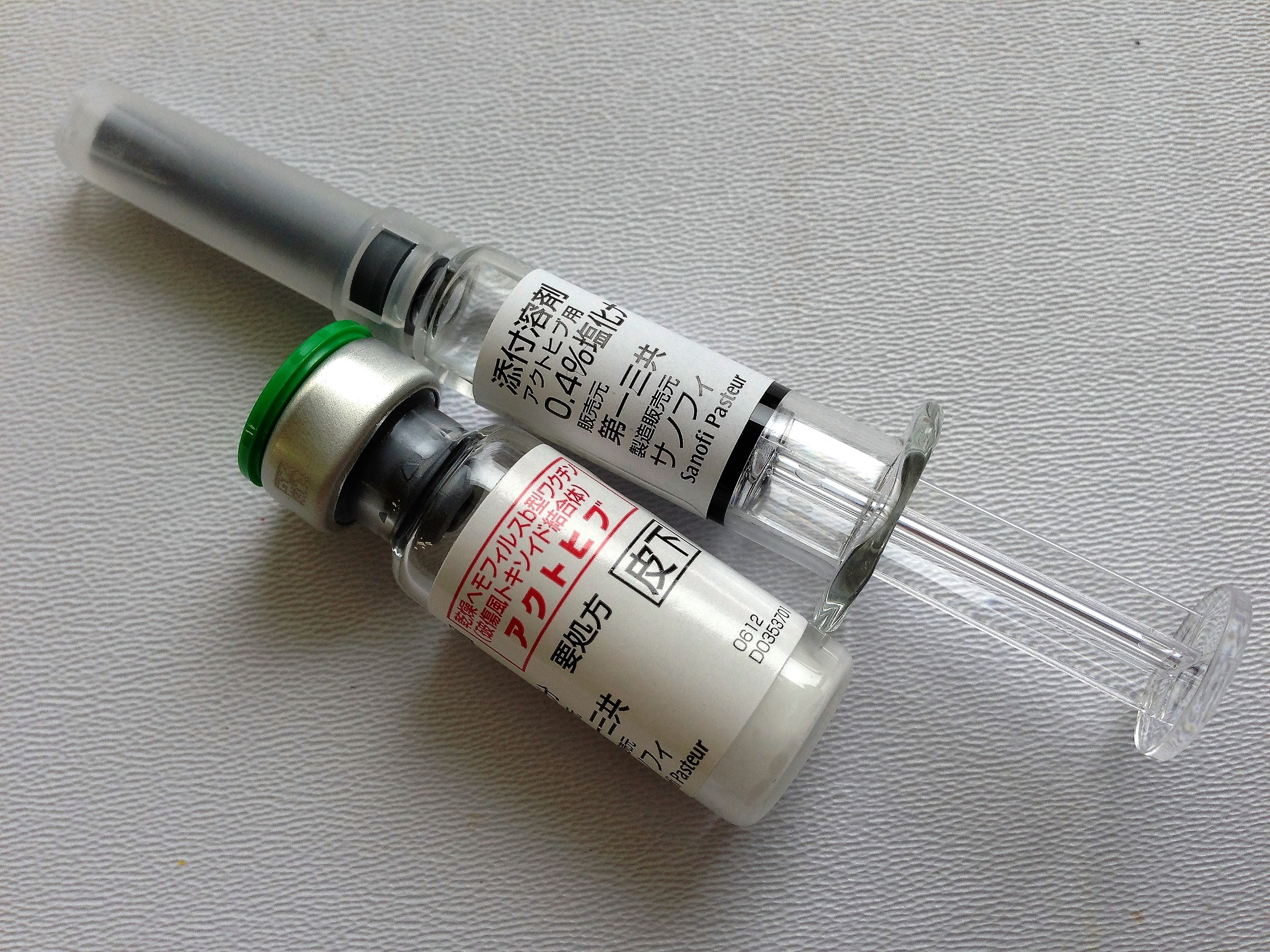
Act-HIb
