= Trudy Virginia Noller Murphy =

American physician, public health epidemiologist and vaccinologist

Trudy Virginia Noller Murphy is an American pediatric infectious diseases physician, public health epidemiologist and vaccinologist. During the 1980s and 1990s, she conducted research at Southwestern Medical School in Dallas, Texas on three bacterial pathogens: Haemophilus influenzae type b (Hib), Streptococcus pneumoniae (pneumococcus), and methicillin-resistant Staphylococcus aureus (MRSA). Murphy's studies advanced understanding of how these organisms spread within communities, particularly among children attending day care centers. Her seminal work on Hib vaccines elucidated the effects of introduction of new Hib vaccines on both bacterial carriage and control of invasive Hib disease. Murphy subsequently joined the National Immunization Program at the Centers for Disease Control and Prevention (CDC) where she led multi-disciplinary teams in the Divisions of Epidemiology and Surveillance and The Viral Hepatitis Division. Among her most influential work at CDC was on Rotashield™, which was a newly licensed vaccine designed to prevent severe diarrheal disease caused by rotavirus. Murphy and her colleagues uncovered that the vaccine increased the risk of acute bowel obstruction (intussusception). This finding prompted suspension of the national recommendation to vaccinate children with Rotashield, and led the manufacturer to withdraw the vaccine from the market. For this work Murphy received the United States Department of Health and Human Services Secretary's Award for Distinguished Service in 2000, and the publication describing this work was recognized in 2002 by the Charles C. Shepard Science Award from the Centers for Disease Control and Prevention.

== Early life and education ==
Murphy was born in Oak Ridge, Tennessee, where her father, George Noller, was employed by the Manhattan Project. She grew up in Berkeley, California, attended Berkeley High School, and graduated from the University of California Berkeley with a BA in Biological Sciences. She earned her medical degree from the University of California Los Angeles and completed her post-graduate pediatric infectious disease work at the University of Texas Southwestern Medical School in Dallas, Texas, under the mentorship of George H. McCracken Jr. and John D. Nelson. Following her fellowship she became a member of the faculty at Southwestern Medical School.

== Research ==
Murphy is the author or co-author of around 100 publications in peer-reviewed academic journals as well as numerous contributions in "Morbidity and Mortality Weekly Report", published by the U.S. Centers for Disease Control and Prevention (CDC). As a faculty member at Southwestern Medical School she established prospective, laboratory-based surveillance of severe bacterial diseases in residents of Dallas County, Texas.^{[1]} In 1998, she joined CDC where her work focused on infectious disease epidemiology and vaccine policy.

=== Haemophilus influenzae type b (Hib) ===
By the 1960s, Hib was recognized as an important cause of invasive bacterial disease in infants and children. By the late 1970s, with increasing use of childcare outside the home, cases of Hib disease were being recognized with increasing frequency among infants and children attending child day care facilities. Whether or not to give antimicrobial prophylaxis to day contacts of a case of Hib disease to prevent secondary cases was controversial. The reasons were that little was known about the extent of asymptomatic Hib colonization among children attending child day care in the absence of cases of disease, or the risk of a secondary case of disease in contacts after exposure to a Hib case. Murphy and her colleagues obtained monthly pharyngeal cultures for Hib from children and their caretakers in a day care center in which no cases of Hib systemic disease had occurred. Despite absence of exposure to a case, 71% of the toddler group and 48% of the preschool group became colonized by Hib at some time during the 18-month-study. These data showed that Hib could be widespread in a day care center without resulting in systemic disease.

In the 1980s, Murphy, collaborating with Dr Dan M Granoff at Washington University School of Medicine in St. Louis, and Dr. Michael Osterholm, at the Minnesota Department of Health, developed prospective active surveillance of Hib disease in Dallas County TX and the State of Minnesota. In one study, Murphy and her colleagues prospectively investigated cases of Hib disease among children attending day care in Dallas County, Texas, to determine the rate of subsequent disease among contacts exposed to a case. During 60 days of follow-up after exposure, there was only a single case among 587 untreated classroom contacts, and no cases among 361 untreated contacts under two years of age, the age group considered to be at highest risk of disease. This low risk indicated that antimicrobial prophylaxis may not be appropriate after the occurrence of a single case of Hib disease in a day-care facility, and that to avoid extensive potentially unnecessary exposure to antimicrobial agents, prophylaxis should be reserved for day care contacts exposed to two or more cases.

In the mid-1980s, a plain (unconjugated) Hib polysaccharide vaccine (called PRP) was licensed by the U.S. Food and Drug Administration (FDA) and recommended for children ages 18 to 72 months. There was controversy about the efficacy of this vaccine and, subsequently, it was replaced by second-generation Hib vaccines in which the polysaccharide was conjugated to protein carriers. The first Hib conjugate vaccine used diphtheria toxoid as the carrier protein, was called PRP-D and was also recommended for the age group 18 to 72 months. Murphy and her colleagues were one of the first to document the decline of Hib disease after introduction of PRP-D vaccine in the U.S. Unexpectedly, they observed a decrease in disease in both the age group being vaccinated and in children less than 18 months of age who at the time were not being vaccinated against Hib. In previous studies, plain polysaccharide vaccines against other encapsulated pathogens (pneumococci and meningococci) protected against invasive disease but did decrease disease in the unvaccinated population or prevent asymptomatic infection of the nasopharynx. Murphy's observations of a decrease in Hib disease among unvaccinated children <18 months of age after introduction of PRP-D in older children, suggested that vaccination might confer indirect protection on developing disease in unvaccinated children by decreasing transmission of the organism in the population (so-called "herd immunity", now called "community protection").

To investigate the effect of Hib vaccination on asymptomatic Hib colonization, Murphy obtained pharyngeal cultures in children attending a day care center and analyzed acquisition of carriage in relation to previous Hib vaccination. Among children exposed to a child with a positive Hib culture, those who had been previously vaccinated with a Hib conjugate vaccine were much less likely to become Hib carriers than those who were unvaccinated, or who had been vaccinated with unconjugated PRP vaccine. Overall, Hib conjugate vaccination in this study was 81% effective in preventing Hib colonization, whereas unconjugated PRP vaccination conferred no significant protection against colonization. These results were unexpected and provided an explanation for the decline in the incidence of Hib disease in unvaccinated children in the general population, namely by decreasing transmission of Hib from vaccinated children to unvaccinated children. This study and others by Murphy et al. documented how protein-conjugate Hib vaccines resulted in dramatic declines in serious Hib infections in the population.

=== Neisseria meningitidis, Streptococcus pneumoniae and methicillin resistant Staphylococcus aureus (MRSA) ===
Murphy subsequently expanded the county-wide surveillance system in Dallas County to include other severe infections by encapsulated bacteria and cases hospitalized with Staphylococcal infection. The results underscored the importance of development of new vaccines for prevention of N. meningitidis (meningococcal) and S. pneumoniae (pneumococcal) infections. She also identified rare strains of S. pneumoniae that caused a form of kidney failure called hemolytic uremic syndrome. Her studies of MRSA in the community and in day care centers were the first to document community spread of MRSA among children in two day care centers.

=== Research informing national vaccine recommendations ===
Rotavirus was a leading cause of severe gastroenteritis among infants and young children. In August 1998, the U.S. Food and Drug Administration (FDA) approved the first rotavirus vaccine for use in infants. The vaccine, called Rotashield™ (Wyeth Lederle Vaccines and Pediatrics] was a live attenuated virus. Within months after introduction, cases of an uncommon form of bowel obstruction (intussusception) were reported in infants who had been given the vaccine, which prompted the CDC to initiate a multi-state public health emergency investigation. Led by Murphy, the investigation found that infants given a first dose of the vaccine were at ~22-fold higher risk of intussusception from 3 to 14 days after vaccination compared to unvaccinated infants. These results were central to suspension of the national recommendation to use Rotashield™, and led the manufacturer to withdraw the vaccine from the market, which paved the way for the development of safer rotavirus vaccines.

==== Research for the Advisory Committee on Immunization Practices (ACIP) ====
At the CDC (1998-2014), Murphy led multi-disciplinary teams that performed critical research and analysis used for updating and creating new ACIP vaccine policy. She also led ACIP working groups that drafted national recommendations for prevention of infectious diseases, including Hib; whooping cough (Bordetella pertussis); tetanus; hepatitis B; and hepatitis A virus infections.

== Leadership ==
The Pediatric Infectious Diseases Society (PIDS) promotes the health of children through prevention and control of infectious diseases worldwide. Murphy's leadership in the organization includes election as Council Member at Large (now known as the board of directors) for 2000–2004, and election as a member of the Nominations and Awards Committee from 2007 to 2009. She also was chair of the Training Programs Committee, a member of the Membership Committee, and served as the PIDS Liaison to both the Infectious Diseases Society of America (IDSA) Adult Infectious Disease Training Programs Committee, and the IDSA Public Health Committee.

Murphy served as the CDC representative for the FDA National Vaccine and Related Advisory Committee (NVRBAC) on licensure application of vaccines by Sanofi Pasteur (Pentacel, DTaP-IPV-Hib) (2007) and by Dynavax (Heplisav, hepatitis B.

Murphy served as the CDC representative and subject matter expert to the WHO Consultation on Preventing Perinatal Hepatitis B Transmission, (2010) and Optimizing Hepatitis B vaccination Schedules (2014–2015).

== Awards and honors ==
For her work uncovering the risk of Rotashield vaccine causing acute bowel obstruction in infants, Murphy received the United States Department of Health and Human Services Secretary's Award for Distinguished Service in 2000.

Murphy and her team on Rotashield vaccine was also recognized by the Charles Shepard Science Award presented by the CDC for the best manuscript on original research published in a reputable, peer-reviewed journal (i.e., Murphy et al., New England Journal of Medicine 2001.
