= Rotavirus vaccine =

Vaccine used to protect against rotavirus infections

Vaccine description
- Target: Rotavirus
- Vaccine type: Attenuated

Clinical data
- Trade names: Rotarix, Rotateq, others
- AHFS/Drugs.com: Monograph
- MedlinePlus: a607024
- License data: US DailyMed: Rotavirus
- Routes of administration: By mouth
- ATC code: J07BH01 (WHO) J07BH02 (WHO)

Legal status
- Legal status: US: ℞-only; EU: Rx-only; In general: ℞ (Prescription only)

Identifiers
- CAS Number: 889856-77-3
- ChemSpider: none
- KEGG: D10193; D10211

A rotavirus vaccine is a vaccine used to protect against rotavirus infections, which are the leading cause of severe diarrhea among young children. These vaccines prevent 15–34% of severe diarrhea in the developing world and 37–96% of the risk of death among young children due to severe diarrhea. Immunizing babies decreases rates of rotavirus disease among older people and those who have not been immunized.

The World Health Organization (WHO) recommends that the rotavirus vaccine be included in national routine vaccinations programs, especially in areas where the disease is common. This should be done along with promoting breastfeeding, handwashing, clean water, and good sanitation. They are given by mouth and two or three doses are required. The approved vaccines are recommended. This includes their use in people with HIV/AIDS. The vaccines are made with weakened rotavirus.

The currently licensed live oral vaccine first became available in the United States in 2006. It is on the World Health Organization's List of Essential Medicines. The vaccines are available in many countries.

== Medical uses ==
Rotavirus vaccine immunization schedule

Share of one year olds vaccinated against rotavirus Map

=== Effectiveness ===
Safety and efficacy trials in Africa and Asia found that the vaccines dramatically reduced severe disease among infants in developing countries, where a majority of rotavirus-related deaths occur. A 2021 Cochrane systematic review concluded that Rotavac, Rotateq, and Rotarix vaccines are safe and are effective at preventing diarrhea that is related to a rotavirus infection.

Rotavirus vaccines are licensed in more than 100 countries, and more than 80 countries have introduced routine rotavirus vaccination. The incidence and severity of rotavirus infections have declined significantly in countries that have acted on the recommendation to introduce the rotavirus vaccine. In Mexico, which in 2006 was among the first countries in the world to introduce rotavirus vaccine, the diarrheal disease death rates from rotavirus dropped by more than 65% among children aged two and under during the 2009 rotavirus season. In Nicaragua, which in 2006 became the first developing country to introduce the rotavirus vaccine, investigators recorded a substantial impact, with rotavirus vaccine preventing 60% of cases against severe rotavirus and cutting emergency room visits in half. In the United States, vaccination has reduced rotavirus-related hospitalizations by as much as 86% since 2006. In April 2016, the World Health Organization released statistics for the period of 2000–2013, which showed that developing countries that have introduced rotavirus vaccines experienced significant decreases in deaths and hospitalizations from rotavirus diarrhea after introduction.

Additionally, the vaccines may prevent illness in non-vaccinated children by limiting exposure to circulating infections. A 2014 review of available clinical trial data from countries routinely using rotavirus vaccines in their national immunization programs found that rotavirus vaccines have reduced rotavirus hospitalizations by 49–92% and all-cause diarrhea hospitalizations by 17–55%.

=== Schedule ===
The World Health Organization recommends the first dose of vaccine be given right after six weeks of age.

== Types ==
=== Rotarix ===
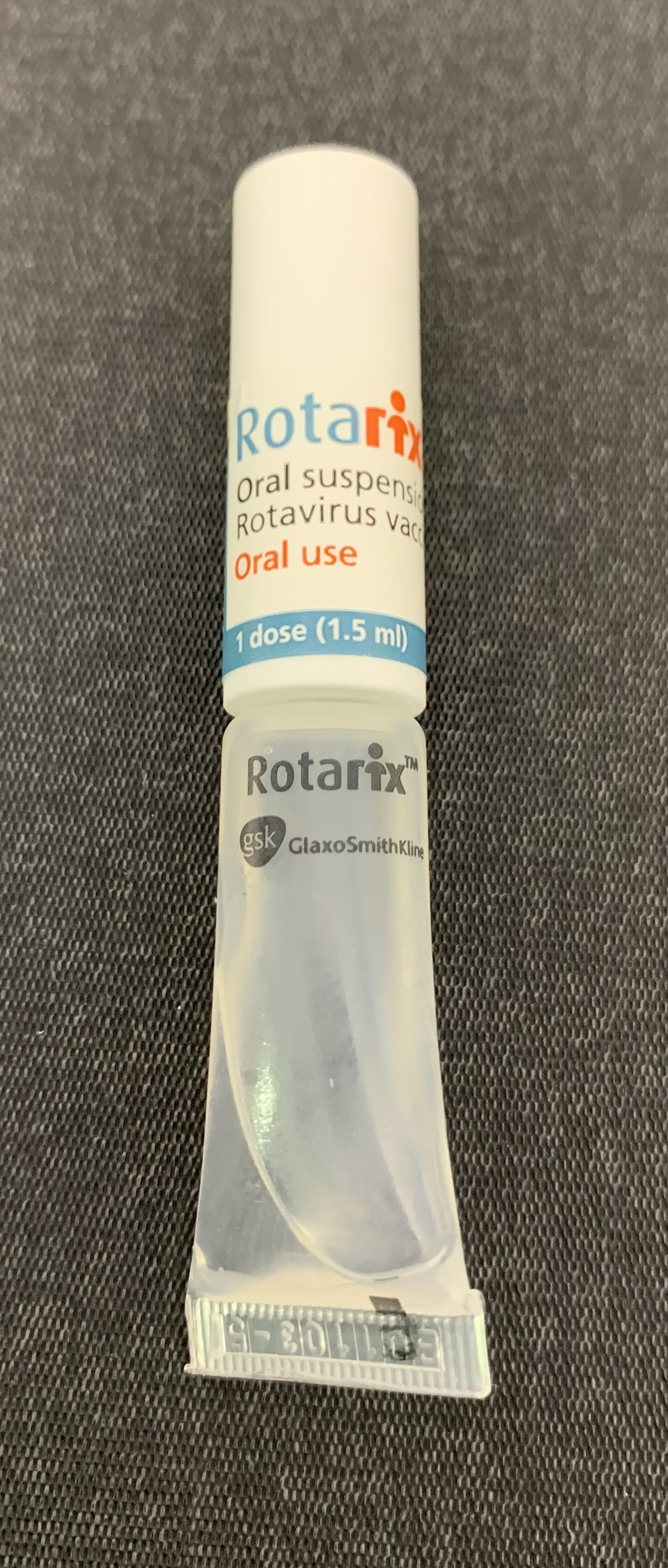
Rotarix vaccine for oral administration

Rotarix is a monovalent, human, live attenuated rotavirus vaccine containing one rotavirus strain of G1P[8] specificity. Rotarix is indicated for the prevention of rotavirus gastroenteritis caused by G1 and non-G1 types (G3, G4, and G9) when administered as a 2-dose series in infants and children. It was approved in the European Union in 2006, and by the US FDA in April 2008. It is taken by mouth.

=== Rotateq ===
Rotateq is a live, oral pentavalent vaccine that contains five rotavirus strains produced by reassortment. The rotavirus A parent strains of the reassortants were isolated from human and bovine hosts. Four reassortant rotaviruses express one of the outer capsid, VP7, proteins (serotypes G1, G2, G3, or G4) from the human rotavirus parent strain and the attachment protein VP4 (type P7) from the bovine rotavirus parent strain. The fifth reassortant virus expresses the attachment protein VP4 (type P1A) from the human rotavirus parent strain and the outer capsid protein VP7 (serotype G6) from the bovine rotavirus parent strain. In February 2006, the US Food and Drug Administration (FDA) approved Rotateq for use in the United States. In August 2006, Health Canada approved Rotateq for use in Canada. Merck worked with a range of partners including governmental and non-governmental organisations to develop and implement mechanisms for providing access to this vaccine in the developing world, an effort which was slated to come to an end in 2020.

=== Rotavac ===
Rotavac was licensed for use in India in 2014 and is manufactured by Bharat Biotech International Limited. It is a live attenuated, monovalent vaccine containing a G9P[11] human strain isolated from an Indian child. It is given by mouth in a three-dose series, four weeks apart, beginning at six weeks of age up until eight months of age.

=== Rotavin-M1 ===
Rotavin-M1 was licensed for use in Vietnam in 2007 and is manufactured by the Center for Research and Production of Vaccines. The vaccine contains a G1P[8] human rotavirus strain.

=== Lanzhou lamb ===
The Lanzhou lamb rotavirus vaccine was licensed for use in China in 2000 and is manufactured by the Lanzhou Institute of Biological Products. It contains a G10P[12] lamb rotavirus strain.

=== Rotasiil ===
Rotasiil is a lyophilized pentavalent vaccine licensed for use in India in 2018. It contains human bovine reassortant strains of rotavirus serotypes G1, G2, G3, G4, and G9. This is the world's first thermostable vaccine which can be stored without refrigeration at or below 25 °C. Rotasiil is manufactured by the Serum Institute of India.

== History ==
In 1998, a rotavirus vaccine (RotaShield, by Wyeth) was licensed for use in the United States. Clinical trials in the United States, Finland, and Venezuela found it to be 80 to 100% effective in preventing severe diarrhea caused by rotavirus A, and researchers detected no statistically significant serious adverse effects. However post-licensure studies conducted in the United States by Trudy Murphy and her colleagues at the Centers For Disease Control and Prevention (CDC) and Kramarz et al., found that infants who received the vaccine were 30 times more likely to develop a severe form of bowel obstruction, called intussusception, during 3 to 7 days after the first dose than unvaccinated infants. The excess risk was estimated between one case in 5,000 to 10,000 vaccinees. Based on these data, the Advisory Committee on Immunization Practices (ACIP) withdrew its recommendation to use the vaccine, and the manufacturer of the vaccine withdrew it from the market in 1999. There then followed eight years of delay until rival manufacturers were able to introduce new vaccines that were shown to be more safe and effective in children: Rotarix by GlaxoSmithKline and Rotateq by Merck. Both are taken orally and contain disabled live virus.

The World Health Organization recommends that rotavirus vaccine be included in all national immunization schedules because the risk of intussusception following rotavirus vaccination remains very low compared with the benefits of preventing the impact of severe and deadly diarrhoea.

== Society and culture ==
=== Economics ===
A 2009 review estimated that vaccination against rotavirus would prevent about 45% of deaths due to rotavirus gastroenteritis, or about 228,000 deaths annually worldwide. At US$5 per dose, the estimated cost per life saved was $3,015, $9,951, and $11,296 in low-, lower-middle-, and upper-middle-income countries, respectively.

More than 80 countries have introduced routine rotavirus vaccination, almost half with the support of Gavi, the Vaccine Alliance.

=== Temporary suspension in the US ===
In March 2010, the detection of DNA from porcine circovirus types 1 and 2 within Rotateq and Rotarix prompted the FDA to suspend the use of rotavirus vaccines while conducting an investigation the finding of DNA from porcine circovirus-1 (PCV1) in the vaccine in collaboration with the 12 members of the Vaccines and Related Biological Products Advisory Committee (VRBPAC). On 6 May 2010, the FDA announced its decision to revoke the suspension, stating that porcine circovirus types 1 and 2 pose no safety risks in humans and concluded that health risks involved did not offset the benefits of the vaccination. In May 2010, the suspension of the Rotarix vaccine was lifted.

== Research ==
Doctors Without Borders (MSF) developed a heat-stable version named BRV-PV. Phase 3 of the clinical trials was completed in Niger on 31 December 2020.

The vaccine has been associated with lower rates of type 1 diabetes.
