= Human Vaccines & Immunotherapeutics =

- Discipline: Vaccinology
- Language: English
- Edited by: Ronald Ellis

Publication details
- Former name(s): Human Vaccines
- History: 2005-present
- Publisher: Taylor & Francis
- Frequency: Monthly
- Impact factor: 4.526 (2021)

Standard abbreviations
- ISO 4: Hum. Vaccines Immunother.
- NLM: Hum Vaccin Immunother

Indexing
- ISSN: 2164-5515 (print); 2164-554X (web)
- LCCN: 2011202528

Links
- Journal homepage; Online access; Online archive

Human Vaccines & Immunotherapeutics is a monthly peer-reviewed medical journal covering research into vaccines and immunotherapeutics in humans. It was established in 2005 as Human Vaccines, and obtained its current name in 2012. It is published by Taylor & Francis and the editor-in-chief is Ronald Ellis (FutuRx). According to the Journal Citation Reports, the journal had a 2013 impact factor of 3.643.
