= DTwP-HepB-Hib vaccine =

Combination vaccine

Combination of
- DTP vaccine: Vaccine
- Hepatitis B vaccine: Vaccine
- Haemophilus vaccine: Vaccine

Clinical data
- Trade names: Quintavax, Pentavac, Pentacel, others
- Routes of administration: Intramuscular injection
- ATC code: Quintavax: J07CA11 (WHO)

Identifiers
- CAS Number: Quintavax: 1196465-46-9; Pentavac: 1688606-53-2

DTwP-HepB-Hib vaccine is a 5-in-1 combination vaccine with five individual vaccines conjugated into one. It protects against diphtheria, tetanus, whooping cough, hepatitis B and Haemophilus influenzae type B, which is generally used in middle- and low-income countries, where polio vaccine is given separately.

By 2013, pentavalent vaccines accounted for 100% of the DTP-containing vaccines procured by UNICEF, which supplies vaccines to a large proportion of the world's children.

== Safety ==
During studies and tests, the conjugated liquid DTPw-HepB-Hib vaccine was found to have positive safety when given as a booster to young children who have been given a vaccination course with another pentavalent booster that requires a change in constitution and was also found to be adequately immunogenic.

== History ==
In October 2004, the European Medicines Agency granted marketing approval to the pentavalent vaccine Quintanrix, manufactured by GlaxoSmithKline. Quintanrix was voluntarily withdrawn by the manufacturer in 2008.

In September 2006, the first pentavalent vaccine formulation received pre-qualification approval from the World Health Organization.

In 2012, UNICEF and the World Health Organization issued and recommended a joint statement to the Immunization Division, Ministry of Health and Family Welfare, Government of India and other developing nations in separate documents about the use of pentavalent vaccines to protect against five of the leading causes of vaccine-preventable death in children.

By 2013, pentavalent vaccines accounted for 100% of the DTP-containing vaccines procured by UNICEF, which supplies vaccines to a large proportion of the world's children.

In 2014, South Sudan became the last of the 73 GAVI-supported countries to introduce the five-in-one vaccine.

== Society and culture ==
In May 2010, Crucell N.V. announced a US$110 million award from UNICEF to supply its pentavalent pediatric vaccine Quinvaxem to the developing world.

In November 2010, the public-private consortium GAVI announced that the cost of the pentavalent vaccine for emerging-market countries had dropped below US$3.00 per dose.

High-income countries tend to use alternative formulations using acellular pertussis (Pa), which has a more favourable profile of side-effects, rather than whole-cell pertussis components. In Europe, hexavalent vaccines that also contain inactivated polio vaccine (IPV) are in wide use.

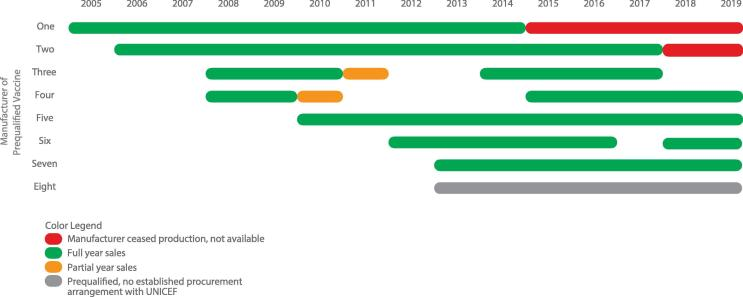
The number of manufacturers making certified pentavalent vaccine

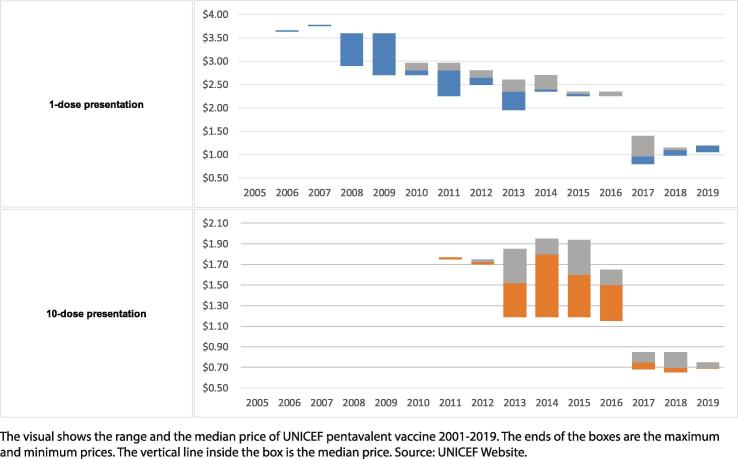
All pentavalent vaccine prices fell and price discrimination almost vanished. Graph by GAVI; non-UNICEF prices not shown.

=== India ===
In 2013, it was found that Pentavac PFS vaccines were being supplied with two different sets of packaging: One set with manufacturing and expiry dates was being provided to private hospitals, whereas the other set without manufacturing and expiry dates was being distributed to government hospitals. It was later clarified that the undated vaccines were supplied by UNICEF and complied with Indian Law.

=== Sri Lanka ===
Sri Lanka introduced Quinvaxem in January 2008. Within three months, four reports of deaths and 24 reports of suspected hypotonic-hyporesponsive episodes prompted regulatory attention and precautionary suspension of the initial vaccine lot. A subsequent death that occurred with the next lot in April 2009 led the authorities to suspend pentavalent vaccine use and resume DTwP and hepatitis B vaccination. Following an investigation by independent national and international experts, the vaccine was reintroduced in 2010.

=== Bhutan ===
Bhutan introduced Easyfive-TT in September 2009. The identification of five cases with encephalopathy and/or meningoencephalitis shortly after pentavalent vaccination prompted the authorities to suspend vaccination on 23 October 2009. Subsequently, four additional serious cases related to vaccine administered prior to suspension were identified and investigated. After a comprehensive review by independent national and international experts, the vaccine was reintroduced in 2011.

=== Vietnam ===
Between December 2012 and March 2013 nine deaths were reported in Viet Nam of children who had recently received injections of the pentavalent vaccine Quinvaxem. On 4 May 2013, the Ministry of Health of Viet Nam announced that use of Quinvaxem was suspended.

After a review of the cases conducted by national experts together with staff from WHO and UNICEF and an independent clinician, no link with vaccination could be identified. The fatalities reported in Viet Nam were attributed to coincidental health problems related in time but not related to the use of Quinvaxem, or cases for which the information available did not allow for a definite conclusion but there were no clinical signs that were consistent with the use of the vaccine. The WHO report emphasized that more than 400 million doses of Quinvaxem had been administered and that no fatal adverse event had ever been associated with Quinvaxem or similar vaccines.

Following additional reports from India, Sri Lanka, and Bhutan of a small number of serious adverse events following immunization with pentavalent vaccines, the WHO asked a global panel of independent experts to review the safety of the vaccine. This review took place 12–13 June 2013 and concluded that no unusual reaction could be attributed to pentavalent vaccines. On 20 June 2013, the Ministry of Health announced that Viet Nam would resume use of Quinvaxem.

The reported events in these Asian nations caused public uncertainty regarding the use of pentavalent vaccines to spread to other developing nations. In response to this, and a corresponding spread of inaccurate information about vaccine safety, the Indian Academy of Pediatrics released a statement in support of pentavalent vaccines.

=== Formulations ===
Common versions of pentavalent vaccines include Quinvaxem, Pentavac PFS, Easyfive TT, ComBE Five, Shan5, and Pentabio.

Vaccine	Manufacturer	Date pre-qualified by WHO
Quinvaxem	Crucell (Note: The vaccine was developed and manufactured by Crucell in Korea and co-produced by Chiron Corporation (later purchased by Novartis International AG on April 20, 2006), which provides four out of the five vaccine elements in bulk.)	26 September 2006
Pentavac PFS	Serum Institute of India	23 June 2010
Easyfive TT	Panacea Biotec	2 October 2013 (Note: Easyfive was removed from the WHO's list of pre-approved and prequalified vaccines in mid-2011. It was re-approved by WHO on 2 October 2013.)
ComBE Five	Biological E. Limited	1 September 2011
Shan5	Shantha Biotechnics	29 April 2014
Pentabio	Bio Farma	19 December 2014
