= Health in Saint Vincent and the Grenadines =

Expenditure on health in Saint Vincent and the Grenadines was 8.6% of GDP in 2014, US$917 per capita.

Life expectancy at birth was estimated at 69 years for men in 2016 and 75 for women.

== Healthcare ==
The Ministry of Health, Wellness and the Environment is responsible for the health facilities.

=== Hospitals ===
- Kingstown General Hospital, also known as the Million Cato Memorial Hospital, is a 209-bed public hospital,
- Maryfield Hospital, private hospital, in Kingstown
- Lowmans and Bequia Casualty Hospital, Port Elizabeth,
- Chateaubelair hospital, which is being improved by the Pan American Health Organization to make it more resilient to natural disasters.

=== Mental health ===
In 2016, Saint Vincent and the Grenadines launched a nationwide initiative to improve the psychological wellness and mental health of the population. The Psychological Wellness Initiative is believed to be the first comprehensive mental health service of its type in the world. This represents an open access, upstream, national programme that is made available online and free-of-charge to individual citizens. This initiative comprises three online programmes for anxiety, low mood and workplace stress, based on Acceptance and Commitment Therapy (ACT). The ACT programmes are provided by Anglo-Finnish innovators Headsted Limited and are sponsored by the European Union as part of the 10th European Development Fund.
