= Hexavalent vaccine =

Single vaccine protecting against six individual diseases

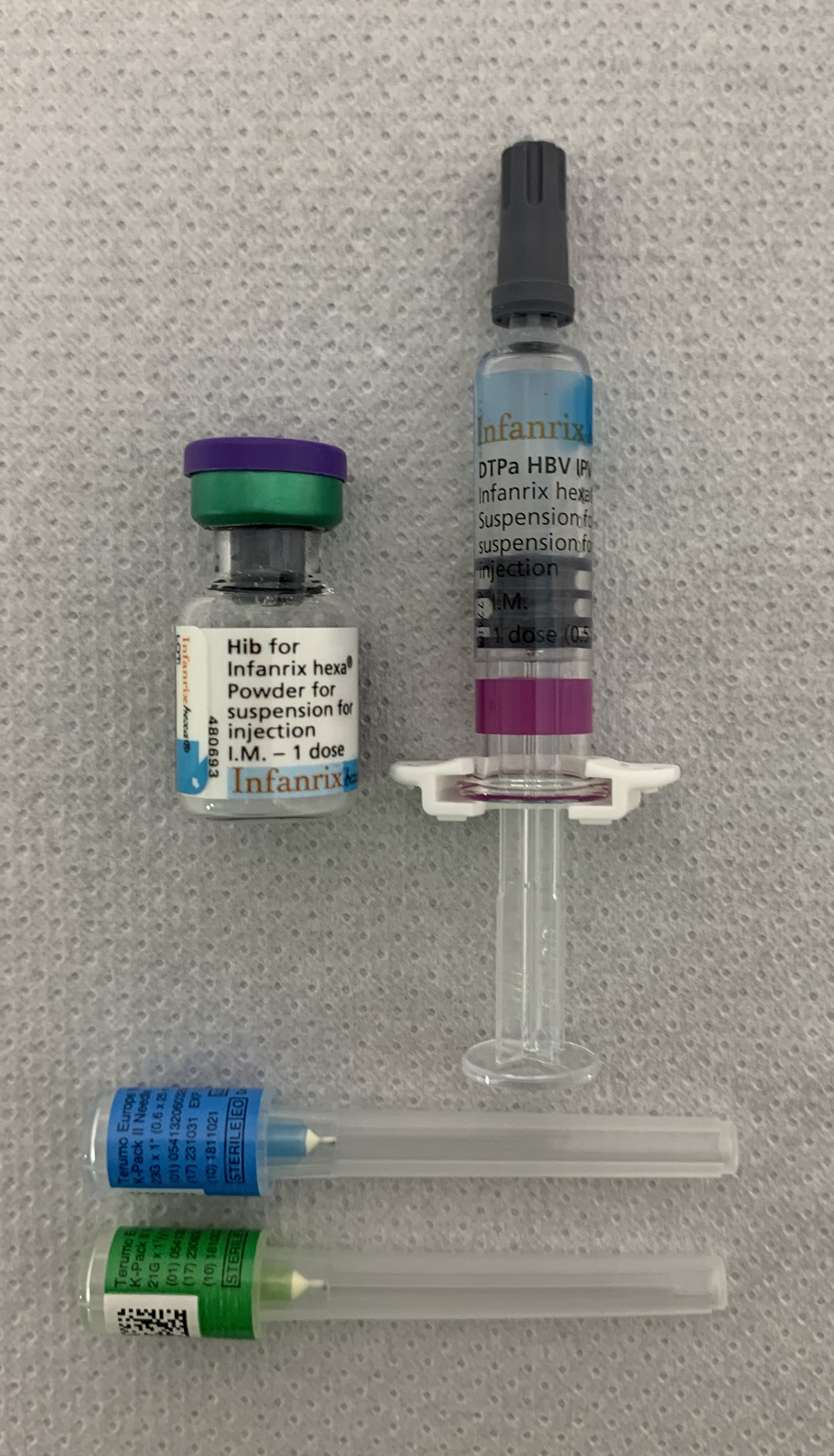
- Infanrix hexa vaccine (one of two brands of the 6-in-1 vaccine used in the UK)

Combination of
- Diphtheria vaccine: Vaccine
- Pertussis vaccine: Vaccine
- Tetanus vaccine: Vaccine
- Hepatitis B vaccine: Vaccine
- Polio vaccine: Vaccine
- Haemophilus vaccine: Vaccine

Clinical data
- Trade names: Infanrix hexa, Hexyon, Vaxelis, others
- AHFS/Drugs.com: Professional Drug Facts
- License data: US DailyMed: Vaxelis
- Pregnancy category: AU: B2
- Routes of administration: Intramuscular
- ATC code: J07CA09 (WHO)

Legal status
- Legal status: AU: S4 (Prescription only); US: ℞-only; EU: Rx-only; In general: ℞ (Prescription only)

Identifiers
- CAS Number: 756896-32-9
- ChemSpider: none

A hexavalent vaccine, or 6-in-1 vaccine, is a combination vaccine with six individual vaccines conjugated into one, intended to protect people from multiple diseases. The term usually refers to the children's vaccine that protects against diphtheria, tetanus, pertussis, poliomyelitis, haemophilus B, and hepatitis B, which is used in more than 90 countries around the world including in Europe, Canada, Australia, Jordan, and New Zealand.

== Formulations ==
The generic vaccine is known as diphtheria and tetanus toxoids and acellular pertussis adsorbed, inactivated poliovirus, haemophilus b conjugate [meningococcal protein conjugate] and hepatitis b [recombinant] vaccine. The liquid vaccine is also known in abbreviated form as DTaP-HepB-IPV-Hib or DTPa-HepB-IPV-Hib. Branded formulations include Hexavac, Hexaxim, Hexyon, and Vaxelis manufactured by Sanofi Pasteur.

There is a two-part formulation known in abbreviated form as DTaP-IPV-HepB/Hib or DTPa-HBV-IPV/Hib. It consists of a suspension of diphtheria, tetanus, acellular pertussis, hepatitis B, and inactivated poliomyelitis (DTaP-IPV-HepB or DTPa-HBV-IPV) vaccine that is used to reconstitute a lyophilised (freeze-dried) Haemophilus influenzae type B (Hib) powder. A branded formulation with a 3-antigen pertussis component, Infanrix hexa, is manufactured by GlaxoSmithKline.

== Society and culture ==
=== Legal status ===
In October 2000, the European Commission issued marketing approval for Hexavac and for Infanrix hexa.

Marketing approval for Hexavac was suspended in November 2005, on the advice of the agency's Committee for Medicinal Products for Human Use (CHMP) in view of the variability of its long-term protection against hepatitis B. In April 2012, the manufacturer Sanofi Pasteur voluntarily withdrew the product from the market. The European Commission formally withdrew marketing permission in June 2012.

In June 2012, the European Medicines Agency (EMA) issued a positive first opinion on Hexaxim for use outside the EU, in cooperation with the World Health Organization (WHO), but later withdrew the opinion.

In April 2013, marketing approval in the EU was granted to Hexyon and to Hexacima.

In February 2016, marketing approval in the EU was granted to Vaxelis.

In December 2018, the US Food and Drug Administration (FDA) licensed a hexavalent combined diphtheria and tetanus toxoids and acellular pertussis (DTaP) adsorbed, inactivated poliovirus (IPV), Haemophilus influenzae type b (Hib) conjugate (meningococcal protein conjugate) and hepatitis B (HepB) (recombinant) vaccine, DTaP-IPV-Hib-HepB (Vaxelis), for use as a three-dose series in infants at ages two, four, and six months. In June 2019, the Centers for Disease Control and Prevention (CDC) Advisory Committee on Immunization Practices (ACIP) voted to include DTaP-IPV-Hib-HepB in the federal Vaccines for Children Program (VFC).
