= Richard Lathe =

Molecular biologist

Richard Lathe is a molecular biologist who has held professorships at the University of Strasbourg, the University of Edinburgh, and the State University of Pushchino. He was assistant director at the biotech company Transgene in Strasbourg, a principal scientist at ABRO, Edinburgh, and Co-Director of the Biotechnology College ESBS based in Strasbourg. Lathe is also the founder of Pieta Research, a biotechnology consultancy in Edinburgh, current academic appointments are with the University of Edinburgh and the State University of Pushchino. He resigned from his post at Pushchino in 2022.

== Early work ==
Lathe studied Molecular Biology at Edinburgh under Bill Hayes and Ken Murray, followed by doctoral studies at Brussels under Rene Thomas. He then moved to Cambridge (under Mike Ashburner), to Heidelberg (Ekke Bautz) before joining the newly founded Biotech company Transgene SA under Jean-Pierre Lecocq, Pierre Chambon, and Philippe Kourilsky.

== Vaccines ==
Lathe is the primary inventor of the vaccine that eradicated rabies in France.; other members of the team included Marie-Paule Kieny. Extension of this work included the development of vaccines against virus-induced tumors. The European rabies vaccination campaigns proved tremendously successful and constituted a paradigm for wildlife vaccination programs. France was declared free of rabies in 2002, but success in North America has been less dramatic owing to the prevalence of several species capable of transmitting rabies

== Gene technology ==
The most highly cited paper regards a tool for isolating coding sequences, published in 1985 in the Journal of Molecular Biology.

This paper makes him among the 1000 citations clan of authors who have achieved a thousand citations for a single-author work

== Hippocampal function ==
A review in the Journal of Endocrinology entitled 'Hormones and the Hippocampus' argues that external and internal biochemical sensing have been crucial for the evolution of the mammalian brain. Although the hippocampus is likely to play a role in internal sensing, other brain regions have been implicated, and a far wider role of the hippocampus in consciousness, episodic memory, and emotional feelings has been discussed

== Autism, Brain, and Environment ==
In Autism, Brain, and Environment (2006, ISBN 1-84310-438-5), Lathe proposes that autism is largely a disorder of the limbic brain, balancing what he calls evidence that environmental factors may trigger autism with a recognition of genetic vulnerability.

== Lunar theory of life's origins on Earth ==
Lathe's research has led him to develop a theory that without the Moon, there would be no life on Earth. When life began, Earth orbited much more closely to the Moon than it does now, causing massive tides every few hours, which in turn caused rapid cycling of salinity levels on coastlines and may have driven the evolution of early DNA. Lathe uses polymerase chain reaction (PCR), which amplifies DNA replication in the lab, as an example of the mechanisms that facilitate DNA replication, In the laboratory, PCR synthesis is achieved by cycling DNA between two extreme temperatures in the presence of certain enzymes. At lower temperatures, about 50 °C, single strands of DNA act as templates for building complementary strands. At higher temperatures, about 100 °C, the double strands break apart, doubling the number of molecules. The synthesis of DNA is started again by lowering the temperature, and so forth. Through this process, one DNA molecule can be converted into a trillion identical copies in just 40 cycles. Saline cycles triggered by rapid tidal activity would have amplified molecules such as DNA in a process similar to PCR, through alternating high and low salinity – a process dubbed tidal chain reaction (TCR) – says Lathe, "The tidal force is absolutely important, because it provides the energy for association and dissociation" of polymers.

A contrasting viewpoint is that deep-sea hydrothermal vents, among other scenarios, may have led to the emergence of life (abiogenesis). In addition, the fast early tides invoked may not have been quite so rapid, and it is possible that only 2-3% of the Earth's crust may have been exposed above the sea until late in terrestrial evolution [4]; although mechanistically sound, the tidal chain reaction theory remains speculative.

== Brain disease ==
The prion theory has been widely questioned, and the prion (PrP) protein is now recognized to be an RNA-binding protein. Darlix and Lathe propose that retroelements constitute the replicative component of the transmissible spongiform encephalopathies.

Lathe has also argued that infection may play a role in Alzheimer disease, and has worked with Rudy Tanzi and Rob Moir at Harvard to develop the Antimicrobial Protection Theory of Alzheimer Disease Building on earlier recommendations of an expert group and increasing evidence that there is a causal link between infection and Alzheimer's disease.
