= Ann Marie McNamara =

American microbiologist

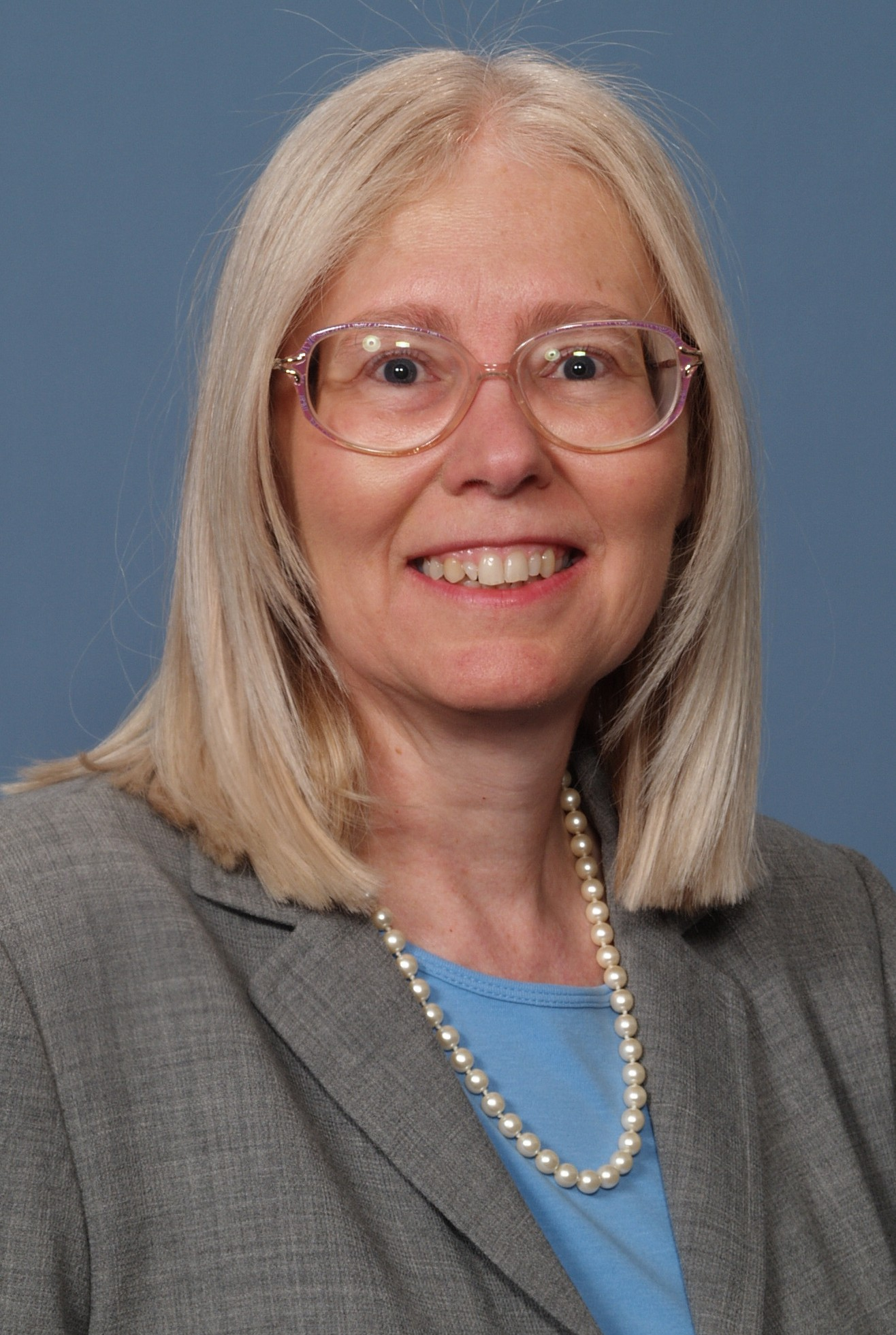
- Education: University of Pittsburgh; University of Minnesota; Quinnipiac University
- Scientific career
- Workplaces: National Institutes of Health; Centers for Disease Control; U.S. Dept. of Agriculture, Food Safety and Inspection Service; Sara Lee Corporation; Mérieux NutriSciences; Jack in the Box; Target Corp. US Foods
- Thesis: Efficacy of four control procedures for Legionella pneumophila in hospital plumbing systems (1987)

Ann Marie McNamara is an American microbiologist and was formerly Vice President for Food Safety and Quality for the Supply Chain at US Foods. She has received a Distinguished Service Award from the United States Department of Agriculture, and received the International Association for Food Protection Fellow Award in 2012 and Food Safety Award in 2022.

== Early life and education ==
McNamara attended Quinnipiac University for undergraduate studies, where she coordinated the first screening program for Tay–Sachs disease at any university in the United States. She earned her M.S degree at the University of Minnesota, with a focus on microbiology. In Minnesota, she completed a research project on the detection of antibodies to La Crosse encephalitis virus. McNamara earned her doctoral degree in Infectious Diseases and Microbiology at University of Pittsburgh School of Public Health. Her research studied the detection and eradication of Legionella from hospital plumbing systems. After graduating, she joined the Centers for Disease Control and Prevention as a postdoctoral resident in Public Health and Medical Microbiology. Her postdoctoral research focused on medical microbiology and epidemiology.

== Research and career ==
McNamara was a Senior Staff Microbiologist at the National Institutes of Health Clinical Center for two years before moving to the United States Department of Agriculture as Director of Microbiology in 1992. At the time she joined the Food Safety and Inspection Service the majority of focus was on chemical adulterants. McNamara's primary focus was developing molecular (polymerase chain reaction) and immunological testing. She was a lead investigator at FSIS for the 1992-1993 Jack in the Box E. coli outbreak. She was a co-author of the Pathogen Reduction/Hazard Analysis and Critical Control Point (PR/HACCP) rule, which required scientifically verifiable methods to reduce the prevalence of pathogenic microorganisms in meat and poultry products.

McNamara joined Sara Lee Corporation in 1999, where she was responsible for food safety and the implementation of a listeria control project following a major Listeria outbreak. She established a food safety research fund at Georgetown University, and developed a program for Listeria control and environmental monitoring. She made use of her background in microbiology, testing food for pathogens and indicator organisms, and creating a risk-based testing program. McNamara worked as Vice President of Food Safety at Silliker, which later became Mérieux NutriSciences. At Silliker, she led the Research group doing process validation studies, and led the Consulting group conducting risk assessments, crisis management engagements and developing food safety plans.

In 2008, McNamara was made Vice President of Food Safety at Jack in the Box, where she oversaw all food safety and quality assurance. She joined Target Corporation in 2017 as their first Vice-President of Food Safety.

== Awards and honors ==
- 2012 International Association for Food Protection Fellow Award
- 2014 Food Safety Magazine Distinguished Service Award
- 2018 International Association for Food Protection John H. Silliker Lecture
- 2022 International Association for Food Protection Food Safety Award

== Selected publications ==
- Tilden J Jr; Young W; McNamara AM; et al. (1 August 1996). "A new route of transmission for Escherichia coli: infection from dry fermented salami". American Journal of Public Health. 86 (8): 1142–1145. doi:10.2105/ajph.86.8_pt_1.1142. ISSN 1541-0048. PMC 1380627. PMID 8712275. Wikidata Q54584730.
- Kathleen A Glass; Dawn A Granberg; Angelique L Smith; Ann Marie Mcnamara; Margaret Hardin; Jane Mattias; Kevin Ladwig; Eric A Johnsoni (1 January 2002). "Inhibition of Listeria monocytogenes by sodium diacetate and sodium lactate on wieners and cooked bratwurst". Journal of Food Protection. 65 (1): 116–123. doi:10.4315/0362-028x-65.1.116. ISSN 0362-028X. PMID 11808782. Wikidata Q43864936.
- Sarwari AR; Magder LS; Levine P; et al. (26 March 2001). "Serotype distribution of Salmonella isolates from food animals after slaughter differs from that of isolates found in humans". The Journal of Infectious Diseases. 183 (8): 1295–1299. doi:10.1086/319671. ISSN 0022-1899. PMID 11262216. Wikidata Q50116314.
