= Marie-Paule Kieny =

French virologist and science writer

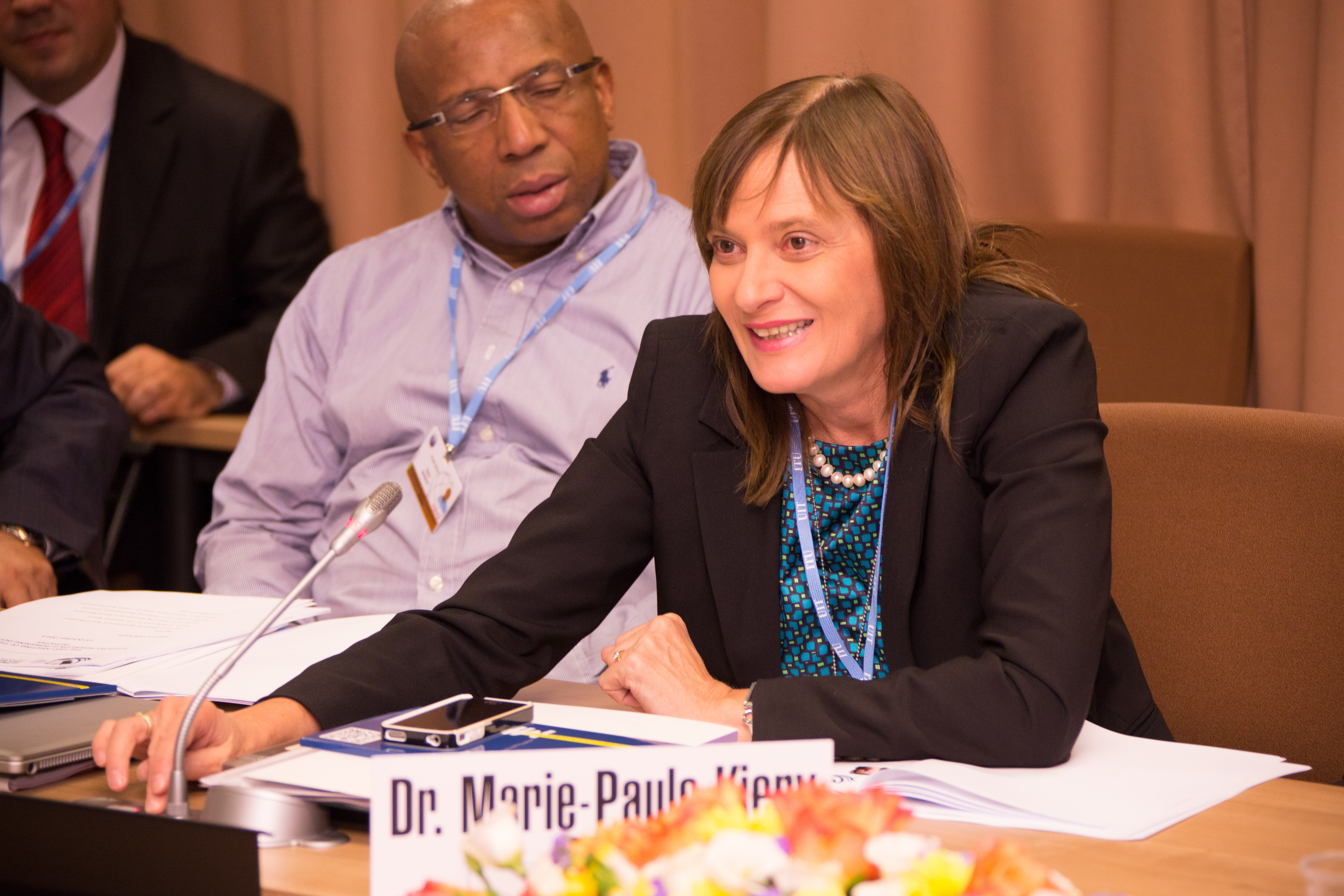
- Education: University of Montpellier; University of Strasbourg

Marie-Paule Kieny is a French virologist, vaccinologist, public health expert and science writer. She is currently director of research at INSERM and Chair of the board of DNDi and of the Medicines Patent Pool.

== Education ==
Kieny completed her PhD in microbiology in 1980 at the University of Montpellier, and received her Habilitation à Diriger des Recherches in 1995 from the University of Strasbourg.

Kieny was presented with an honorary doctorate from the Autonomous University of Barcelona in 2019 for her commitment to public health and worldwide universal health care.

== Career ==
After completing her PhD, Kieny took up a position at Transgene SA, Strasbourg, as assistant scientific director under scientific director Jean-Pierre Lecocq until 1988.

Kieny became director of research at Inserm for the first time between 1999 and 2000. Kieny was a member of the European Vaccine Initiative until 2010.

Kieny was vaccine research director of WHO from 2002 to 2010, most notably during the 2009 swine flu pandemic. She was promoted to assistant director-general, playing a major leadership role during the Ebola virus epidemic in West Africa and the 2015–16 Zika virus epidemic. Kieny even audaciously signed up herself as a test subject for the safety of new Ebola vaccines being developed, amidst concerns over the logistics and ethics of testing early-stage therapeutics and preventatives for ebola in the context of an ongoing epidemic. Given the slow development of new therapies in response to the outbreak, Kieny and colleagues began making a framework to speed up development and encourage researchers to share data openly without worrying about being scooped. She commented on the successful development of efficacious vaccines for deployment in a future outbreak. In aftermath of the 2014 Democratic Republic of the Congo Ebola virus outbreak Kieny stated that the vaccine may not be required since the outbreak was not as serious as previously feared. Kieny was involved also in addressing the ongoing antimicrobial resistance crisis with WHO, overseeing the first WHO Model List of Essential Medicines to include guidance on proper use of antibiotics within the framework of universal health care. She helped prepare a list of Antibiotic resistant bacteria which should be prioritised for research beyond just Extensively drug-resistant tuberculosis, such as Acinetobacter baumannii and Pseudomonas aeruginosa strains resistant to Carbapenem.

Kieny was one of seven vaccine experts interviewed in 2012 by Wired about what the next decade held for vaccine innovation.

In 2017 she joined the board of directors for the Human Vaccines Project, was made interim director of the Medicines Patent Pool (MPP), and joined the Drugs for Neglected Diseases Initiative (DNDi) as chief of the board. As head of MPP, Kieny oversaw the licensing of the Hepatitis C drug Mavyret for generic production.

== Other activities ==
- BioMérieux, Independent Member of the Board of Directors
- Fondation Mérieux, Chair of the Scientific Advisory Board
- GISAID, Member of the Nomination Committee, Advisor
- Global Antibiotic Research and Development Partnership (GARDP), Member of the Board of Directors
- Joint Programming Initiative on Antimicrobial Resistance (JPIAMR), Member of the Management Board
- Solthis – Therapeutic Solidarity and Initiatives for Health, Member of the Board of Directors
- Vanke School of Public Health at Tsinghua University, Member of the International Advisory Board
- Wellcome Trust, Chair of the Strategic Advisory Board on Vaccines and Drug-resistant Infections
- Wellcome Trust, Member of the Strategic Advisory Board on Innovation

== Awards ==
- 2017 Inserm International Prize.
- 1994 Prix Génération 2000-Impact Médecin
- 1991 Prix de l'Innovation Rhône-Poulenc

== Decorations ==
- 2021 Officier de l'Ordre national du Mérite (chevalier in 2000)
- 2016 Chevalier de la Legion d'honneur.
