= Mérieux NutriSciences =

American and French company

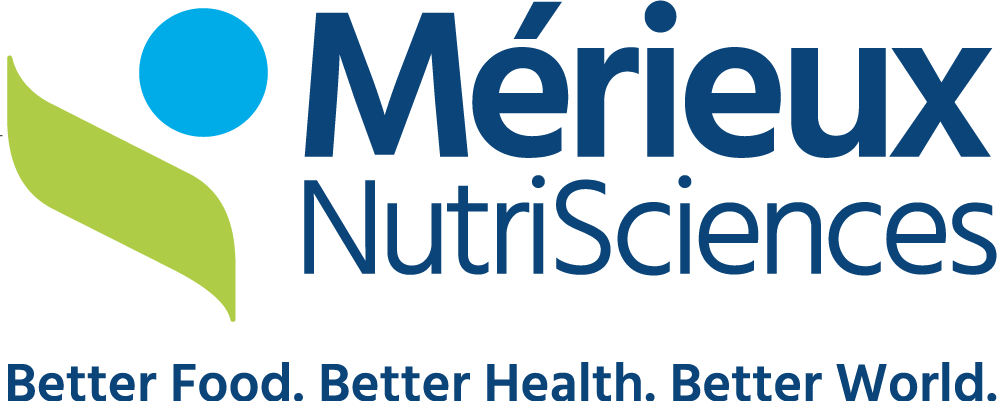

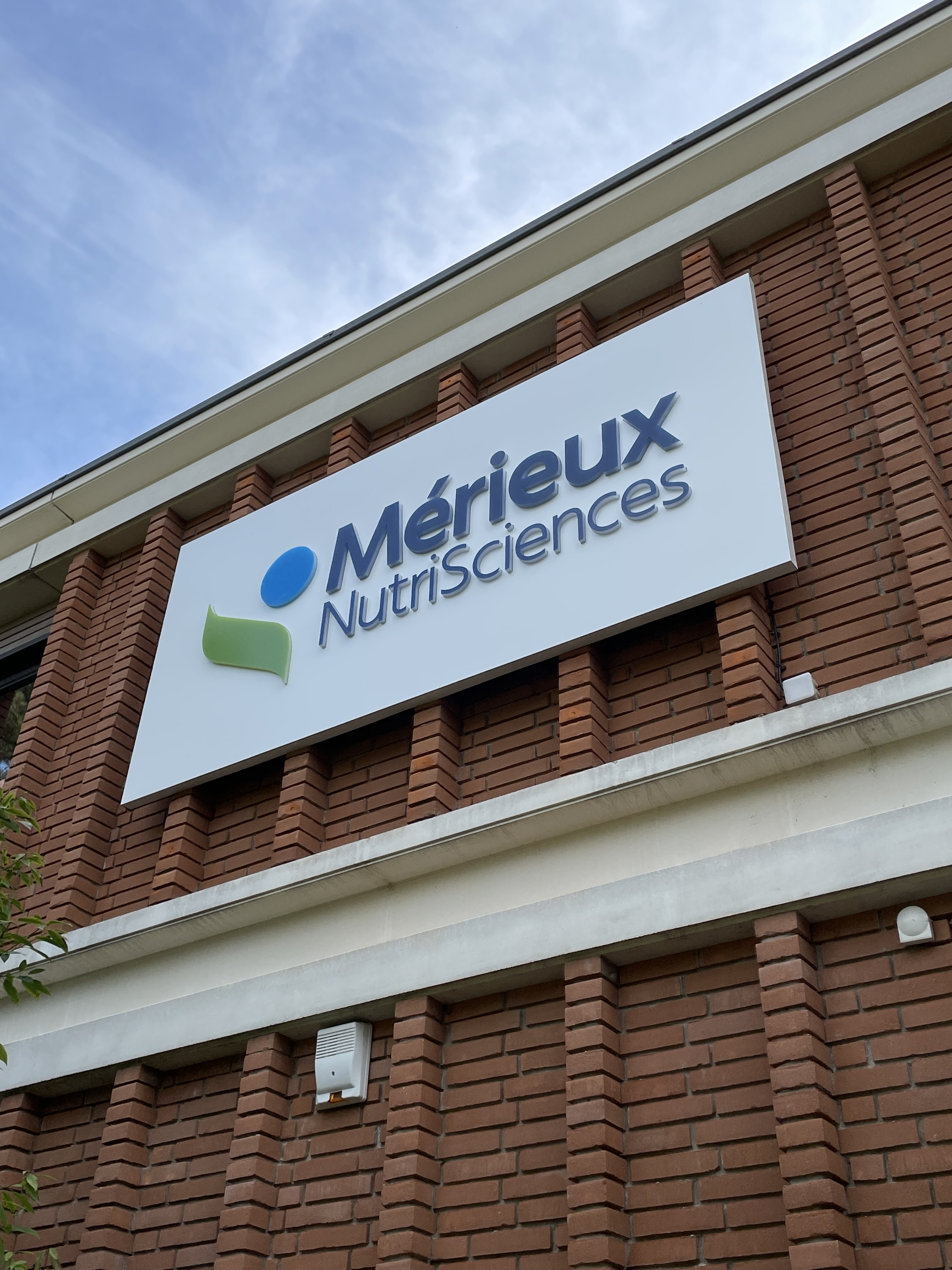
- Mérieux NutriSciences Global Office
- Company type: Subsidiary
- Industry: Food Safety, Quality & Sustainability
- Predecessor: Silliker
- Founded: 1967; 59 years ago
- Founder: Dr. John H. Silliker
- Headquarters: Chicago, United States Tassin-la-Demi-Lune, France
- Number of locations: 140 laboratories (2020)
- Area served: Worldwide
- Key people: Dr John H. Silliker (founder), Alexandre Mérieux (chairman of the board), Nicolas Cartier (CEO)
- Services: Food analysis, Water analysis, Environmental monitoring, Contract research, Consulting on quality and safety, Sensory and consumer studies, Labeling service, Data management, Training, Audit and inspection
- Number of employees: More than 10,000
- Parent: Institut Mérieux
- Website: merieuxnutrisciences.com

Mérieux NutriSciences is an American-French multinational company specializing in food safety, quality, sustainability testing, consulting, and training services.

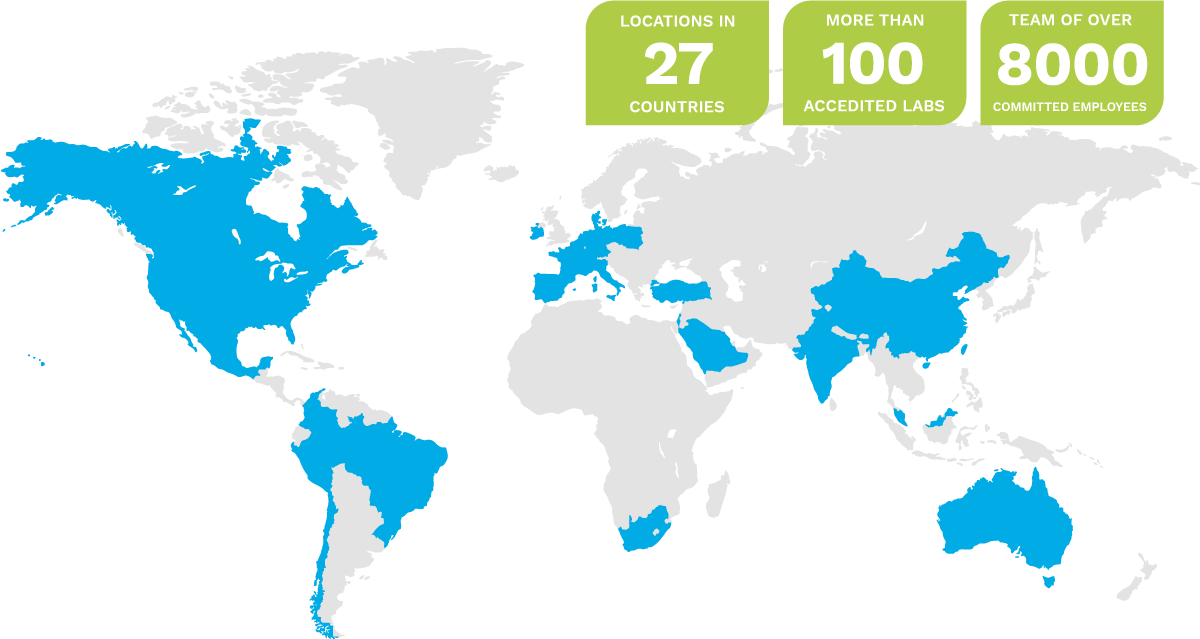
Mérieux NutriSciences Global Presence in 2021

It is a subsidiary of Institut Mérieux and operates over 140 laboratories in approximately 32 countries, serving more than 10,000 employees worldwide. The company is headquartered in Chicago (United States) and Tassin‑la‑Demi‑Lune (France).

With a history in food microbiology, Mérieux NutriSciences' business is mainly focused on services for the food sector, addressing the needs of raw materials & ingredients suppliers, food manufacturers, processors, caterers, and retail companies. The company also operates in packaging and pharmaceutical quality management.

== History ==
- 1967: Creation by Dr. John H. Silliker in Chicago of the company Silliker, a food-focused solutions company.
- 1997: Acquisition of Silliker by Institut Mérieux
- 2011: The Group is officially named Mérieux NutriSciences
- 2025: Acquisition of the Food testing business of Bureau Veritas, including a joint venture with AsureQuality - resulting in the company enlarging its footprint to 32 countries and doubling its footprint in Canada and Asia-Pacific.

In 1897, Marcel Mérieux, a student of Louis Pasteur, founded Institut Mérieux.

The Institut Mérieux was then directed by Dr. Charles Mérieux and later by Alain Mérieux and became the leader in the field of human and veterinary vaccines.

Until 1994, the Mérieux family managed several companies in this area before withdrawing from the vaccinology work.

Meanwhile, in Chicago, Silliker, a company in the field of food safety and quality was created in 1967 by Dr. John H. Silliker, a microbiologist known for his work on Salmonella.

The Mérieux Family acquired Siliker in the 1990s. The company was renamed Mérieux NutriSciences in 2011.

== Acquisitions ==
Mérieux NutriSciences has completed more than 50 acquisitions since 2007. The company has a worldwide presence, with sites in Europe, North America, Asia, Latin America, the Middle East, and Africa.

=== 2019 ===
- Swiss Food (Germany)
- Institut Kirchhoff (Germany)
- KTBA (Netherlands)
- EcamRicert (Italy)
- Acumen Scientific (Malaysia)
- ALT (Ireland)
