= Fondation Mérieux =

French foundation

The Fondation Mérieux is an independent family foundation recognized for public utility created by Charles Mérieux. Its mission is to contribute to global health by strengthening local capacities in developing countries to reduce the impact of infectious diseases on vulnerable populations.

== History ==
The FM was created in 1967 by Doctor Charles Mérieux, in homage to his father Marcel Mérieux, pupil of Louis Pasteur and founder of the Institut Mérieux in 1897. It was recognized in French law as "for public utility" in 1976.

The foundation is present in 18 countries such as Mali, Cambodia, Laos and Haiti. and builds its projects with the health authorities and local partners.

In October 2004, the FM was the beneficiary of a Franco-Chinese agreement that led to the creation of the Institut Pasteur de Shanghai and the donation of four truck-trailer BSL-3 laboratories, supplied by Labover.

In 2012, the FM continued its partnership with the Chinese Academy of Medical Sciences. The partnership, which is renewed by contract every five years, was begun with Phase I in 2007. In this case, the FM was interested in the study of tuberculosis. Inter alia, Phase I of the CAMS-FM partnership funds trained "132 laboratory professionals at national, prefectural et and municipal levels."

In 2015, the CAMS-FM partnership founded the Christophe Mérieux Laboratory (CML) at the Institute of Pathogen Biology in Beijing to focus on the study pneumonia and tuberculosis. Researchers at the CML "benefit from and training modules developed by the Emerging Pathogens Laboratory in Lyon", a BSL-4 lab which was also built by the FM in 1999 and since 2005 is now operated by INSERM.

In 2015, the FM participated in the donation by the French government of CIRI's Biosafety Level 4 expertise to the Wuhan Institute of Virology. This laboratory was accused by the leak of Covid-19, but there was not found any direct evidence that SARS-CoV-2 was inside a laboratory in Wuhan before the pandemic, although the lab has not released its records, which have been sought by scientists and governments around the world.

In January 2017, a researcher who was financed by the CAMS-FM partnership participated in a study of human rhinovirus and genotype A21.

In July 2020, it was announced that a researcher employed at the CAMS-FM participated in the development of a low-cost COVID-19 screening test, which uses a variant of the CRISPR technology.

== Synopsis ==
The FM plays a role in the fight against infectious diseases by intervening in various areas:

- Increase access to diagnosis because diagnosis is an essential tool for surveillance and control of diseases.
- Reinforce research capacities, in particular by training teams on site and by setting up a research program.
- Exchange and share knowledge, for the dissemination of global medical advances
- Acting for mother and child, the most vulnerable to infectious diseases

== See also ==
- Mérieux Family
