= Alain Israël =

French researcher

Alain Israël, born on 13 June 1949 in Neuilly-sur-Seine, is a French researcher, director of research emeritus at the CNRS since 2014, and a member of the French Academy of sciences.

== Biography ==
After studying at the University of Paris VII, he completed a thesis in virology at the University of Lyon in 1980, followed by 3 years of postdoctoral training at Stanford University, with Stanley Cohen. In 1983 he joined the laboratory directed by Philippe Kourilsky at the Pasteur Institute. In 1992 he took over the management of the Molecular Signaling and Cellular Activation Unit at the Pasteur Institute.

== Scientific work ==
The main objective of the research carried out by Israël and his team for more than twenty years has been cell signaling mechanisms in mammalian cells, focusing essentially on two signalling pathways: the NF-κB pathway and the Notch pathway.

Among his main discoveries are:

- Cloning of the first NF-κB subunit in 1990
- Cloning of NEMO, the main regulating subunit of the NF-κB track
- Identification of the first genetic disease related to a defect in the NF-κB pathway (collaboratively
- Identification of the first genetic disease related to a defect in the LUBAC ubiquitination complex (collaboratively)
- Characterization of the Notch pathway activation mode: 1) successive cleavages of the Notch receptor 2) the cleaved receptor is transported into the nucleus where it directly co-activates its target genes

Professor Alain Israël is the author of more than 150 scientific publications in internationally renowned journals;

== Main distinctions ==
- Director of Scientific Evaluation at the Institut Pasteur in 2000.
- Member of EMBO since 2000.
- Member of Academia Europaea since 2000.
- Member of the French Academy of sciences in 2004 in the Molecular and Cellular Biology - Genomics section.
- Chevalier of the Légion d'Honneur in 2008.
- Member of the CNRS Scientific Council from 2010 to 2014.
