= BioMérieux =

French multinational biotechnology company

bioMérieux SA
- Type: Société Anonyme
- Traded as: Euronext Paris: BIM; CAC Next 20 component
- ISIN: FR0013280286
- Industry: Biotechnology
- Founded: 1963; 63 years ago
- Founder: Dr Alain Mérieux
- Headquarters: Marcy-l'Étoile, France
- Area served: Worldwide
- Key people: Pierre Boulud (CEO); Alexandre Mérieux (Chairman); Dr Marcel Mérieux; Dr Charles Mérieux
- Products: in vitro diagnostics
- Revenue: €3.1 billion (2020)
- Operating income: 587,000,000 euro (2022)
- Net income: 452,000,000 euro (2022)
- Number of employees: 12,800 (2020)
- Website: www.biomerieux.com

bioMérieux SA is a French multinational biotechnology company founded and headquartered in Marcy-l'Étoile, France, close to Lyon. bioMérieux is present in 44 countries and serves more than 160 countries through a large network of distributors.

bioMérieux provides diagnostic solutions (reagents, instruments, software, services) which determine the source of disease and contamination to improve patient health and ensure consumer safety. Its products are used for diagnosing infectious diseases, cancer screening, and monitoring and cardiovascular emergencies. They are also used for detecting microorganisms in agri-food, pharmaceutical and cosmetic products. bioMérieux is listed on the Euronext Paris stock exchange (BIM – ISIN: FR0013280286).

== Revenue ==
bioMérieux had revenues of €3.1 billion as of 2020 with 93% of sales occurring outside France.

== History ==
In 1897, Marcel Mérieux, former assistant to Louis Pasteur, founded the Mérieux Biological Institute, which later became Institut Mérieux. In 1963, Alain Mérieux founded BD Mérieux, of which he became majority shareholder in 1974. BD Mérieux would later become bioMérieux. The company expanded its services and offerings through product development, acquisitions and partnerships:

- Api Systems, acquired in 1987
- Vitek Systems, acquired in 1988
- Organon Teknika, acquired in 2001 from Akzo Nobel
- Bacterial Barcodes, acquired in 2006
- Biomedics (Spain) and BTF (Australia), acquired in 2007
- AB Biodisk (Sweden), AviaraDx (bioTheragnostics today) (USA) and PML Microbiologicals (USA), acquired in 2008
- Meikang Biotech and of Shanghai Zenka Biotechnology, acquired in 2010
- AES Laboratoire and Argene (France), acquired in 2011
- RAS (India), a specialist in molecular biology, acquired in 2012
- Partnership with Quanterix in 2012 for the development of a new generation of ultrasensitive, multiplex immunoassays.
- BioFire Diagnostics Inc., a privately held US-based company specialized in molecular biology, acquired in 2014
- BioMerieux molecular biology affiliate BioFire, LLC. opened the Alain Mérieux Center for Molecular Diagnostics in Salt Lake City, Utah in 2017
- Invisible Sentinel, A Philadelphia life sciences company that develops novel technology to quickly detect pathogens in food and beverages including wine and beer.
- BioMerieux acquired Neoprospecta, a company that develops genomics and data solutions for mitigating microbial contamination in the pharmaceutical and food industries, in 2025.

Institut Mérieux, which belongs to the Mérieux family, is the main shareholder of bioMérieux. Jean-Luc Bélingard is President, and Alexandre Mérieux is General Director. bioMérieux was listed on the stock exchange in 2004.

Labrador Diagnostics filed a lawsuit against BioFire Diagnostics, a subsidiary of bioMérieux, for patent infringement on March 9, 2020. On March 11, 2020, bioMérieux announced the finalization of their real-time PCR SARS-COV-2 R-GENE test. The company also announced the development of a fully automated test based on the BioFire FilmArray technology with the support of the United States Department of Defense. Lastly, bioMérieux launched development on an expanded version of its BioFire FilmArray Respiratory Panel 2. The new version included SARS-CoV-2 in addition to the 21 other common respiratory pathogens and delivered results in approximately 45 minutes. After this announcement, Labrador issued a statement claiming that when it filed the lawsuit against BioFire it had no idea BioFire was developing COVID-19 testing kits. Fortress Investment Group, parent company to Labrador, offered to grant both the defendants and anyone else a royalty-free license for its technology for use in COVID-19 tests. bioMérieux and BioFire declined Labrador's offer.

In June 2021, bioMérieux launched EPISEQ SARS-COV-2, a cloud-based software application for the epidemiological surveillance of SARS-CoV-2 variants. The application identifies variants based on international nomenclatures, including any new variant of concern (VOC), and is compatible with three major sequencing platforms (Illumina, Inc., Oxford Nanopore Technologies, Thermo Fisher Scientific).

== Shareholders ==
As of February 2021:

| Nom | |
| Institut Mérieux | 58.9% |
| Groupe Dassault | 4.6% |
| GIMD | 4.6% |
| Sofina | 2.1% |
| Employees | 0.6% |
