= Black Pearl Award =

Black Pearl Award may refer to:

- Black Pearl Award (Abu Dhabi), award made at the Abu Dhabi Film Festival
- Black Pearl Award (EURORDIS), award made by EURORDIS in the field of rare diseases
- Black Pearl Award (food safety), award made by the International Association for Food Protection
