= Responses to the COVID-19 pandemic in November 2021 =

Sequence of major events in a virus pandemic

This article documents the chronology of the response to the COVID-19 pandemic in November 2021, which originated in Wuhan, China in December 2019. Some developments may become known or fully understood only in retrospect. Reporting on this pandemic began in December 2019.

== Reactions and measures in the United Nations ==
=== 16 November ===
- Pfizer has signed a deal with the United Nations–backed Medicines Patent Pool allowing Paxlovid to be manufactured and sold under license in 95 developing countries with "the goal of facilitating greater access to the global population." However, the deal excludes several countries with major COVID-19 outbreaks including Brazil, China, Russia, Argentina, and Thailand.

== Reactions and measures in Africa ==
=== 23 November ===
- South Africa releases a genomic assay showing a record number of mutations -32- on the protein spike of variant B.1.1.529, stoking world-wide alarm given the massive rise in the number of cases in the region and its being on track to overtake the Delta Variant. First discovered from a sample taken in Botswana on 11 November, the report triggers an emergency WHO meeting on 26 November.

=== 26 November ===
- The United Kingdom, European Union, and United States have imposed travel restrictions on eight southern African countries including South Africa, Botswana, Zimbabwe, Namibia, Lesotho, Eswatini, Mozambique, and Malawi in order to contain the spread of the B.1.1.52 (Omicron) Variant.
- South African Minister of Health Joe Phaahla has objected to the travel restrictions on South Africa, defending South Africa's handling of the pandemic and describing travel bans as against the "norms and standards" of the World Health Organization.

=== 27 November ===
- New Zealand has imposed travel restrictions on South Africa, Namibia, Zimbabwe, Botswana, Lesotho, Eswatini, Seychelles, Malawi and Mozambique in response to the Omicron variant. Entry is restricted to citizens, who will have to undergo managed isolation and quarantine.

== Reactions and measures in the Eastern Mediterranean ==
=== 10 November ===
- The Israeli Government has approved the use of COVID-19 vaccines for children between the ages of 5 and 11 years.

== Reactions and measures in Europe ==
=== 4 November ===
- The United Kingdom is the first country to approve a COVID pill.

=== 9 November ===
- The United Kingdom has added the Chinese CoronaVac and the Sinopharm BIBP vaccine and Indian Covaxin to its approved list of Covid-19 vaccines for inbound travel from 22 November.

=== 15 November ===
- Austria has ordered a nationwide lockdown for unvaccinated people in response to record infection rates and growing pressure on hospitals. Unvaccinated people will only be allowed to leave home for a limited number of reasons including working or buying food.

=== 26 November ===
- The first European case of the B.1.1.529 variant is discovered in an unvaccinated female tourist in Belgium who had no direct link with South Africa, but who rather had traveled from Egypt to Turkey.
- The United Kingdom temporarily blocks direct flights from six Southern African countries.
- The European Commission has announces that it would be imposing temporary travel restrictions on Southern African countries.

== Reactions and measures in South, East and Southeast Asia ==
=== 1 November ===
- Malaysian Prime Minister Ismail Sabri Yaakob launched a National Vaccine Development Roadmap (PPVN) and Malaysian Genome and Vaccine Institute (MGVI) to stimulate vaccine production in Malaysia. These projects include producing two types of COVID-19 vaccines using inactivated virus and mRNA technologies and a therapeutic cancer vaccine for the treatment of head and neck cancer.

=== 8 November ===
- The Malaysian and Singaporean Governments established a quarantine free-travel lane for fully vaccinated travellers between Kuala Lumpur International Airport and Changi International Airport, which comes into effect on 29 November. In addition, Sweden and Finland will be included in Singapore's quarantine free travel lanes programme from 29 November.

=== 9 November ===
- The Singaporean Government has announced that it will no longer pay the COVID-19 medical bills of people "unvaccinated by choice," citing the strain they have placed on intensive care and healthcare resources.

=== 15 November ===
- The Singaporean Government has announced plans to introduce "vaccine travel lanes" (VTL) with Indonesia and India from 29 November 2021. Singapore also plans to expand the VTL scheme to Qatar, Saudi Arabia and the United Arab Emirates from 6 December 2021.

=== 17 November ===
- The Malaysian Drug Control Authority has given conditional approval for the use of the Oxford-AstraZeneca and the CoronaVac vaccines as COVID-19 booster shots for individuals aged 18 years and above.

=== 24 November ===
- The Malaysian and Singaporean Governments have agreed to establish a land Vaccinated Travel Lane (VTL) between the two countries for vaccinated citizens, permanent residents, and long-term pass holders from both countries.

=== 26 November ===
- Due to the burgeoning B.1.1.529 variant, Japan has imposed temporary travel bans on South Africa, Eswatini, Zimbabwe, Namibia, Botswana and Lesotho. Travelers from those countries will be required to undergo a 10-day quarantine period.

== Reactions and measures in the Western Pacific ==
=== 1 November ===
- Fijian schools have reopened for Years 12 and 13 students subject to COVID-Safe protocols, ending an extended six-and-a-half month break.
- Prime Minister of New Zealand Jacinda Ardern has announced that the Waikato region will move down to step 2 of Alert Level 3 at 11:59 pm on 2 November. This allows retailers to operate with face masks and physical distance; increases the number of people at outdoor gatherings to 25; and removes the two-household restriction. Auckland will move down to step 2 of Alert Level 3 at 11:59pm on 9 November.
- The Tongan Government has imposed a seven day lockdown on the main island of Tongatapu following the island state's first reported case on 29 October. Public gatherings except funerals were banned while most economic activities apart from banks and essential services were ordered to close down. The sale of alcohol was also banned.

=== 2 November ===
- New Zealand's COVID-19 Response Minister Chris Hipkins has placed the northern part of the Northland Region under an Alert Level 3 lockdown after authorities were unable to find any epidemiological links for two community cases.

=== 8 November ===
- Fijian Permanent Secretary for Health Dr James Fong confirmed that frontliners and Fijians with comorbid issues will be prioritized for booster shots.
- New Zealand Prime Minister Ardern announced that Auckland will move down to step 2 of Alert Level 3 from 10 November. Retail stores, museums and zoos will be allowed to reopen. Outdoor gatherings, funerals, weddings, and civil unions will be allowed with an increased 25 person limit. The Far North District, which was put into level 3 in the middle of last week, will also move down to alert level 2 on 12 November.

=== 9 November ===
- Economic and Regional Development Minister Stuart Nash announced that the New Zealand Government would subsidise the costs of big events over the 2021–2022 summer break under its event transition support scheme.

=== 10 November ===
- The New Zealand Education Minister Chris Hipkins has announced that all students in Auckland and Waikato will be able to return to school from 17 November. Year 9 and 10 students would be able to return fulltime while most students in Years 1-8 would be returning part-time.
- The New Zealand Government has announced that the Oxford–AstraZeneca COVID-19 vaccine would be made available from late November 2021 for a small number of people aged 18 or over who are medically unable to get the Pfizer vaccine.

=== 17 November ===
- New Zealand COVID-19 Response Minister Hipkins launched the Government's "My Vaccine Pass," which can be used as a vaccine certificate for various public events, hospitality, community, sport and faith-based gatherings.
- New Zealand Prime Minister Ardern announced that the country will move into "traffic light system" from 29 November and that the Auckland boundary will open to vaccinated or tested people from 15 December.

=== 19 November ===
- Fiji's national nighttime curfew was moved by one hour from 11pm to 12 am after the island state reached its 90% fully vaccinated rate.

=== 22 November ===
- Australian Prime Minister Scott Morrison has announced that fully vaccinated international students and eligible skilled migrant visa holders and refugees will be allowed to enter the country from next month without seeking an exemption from 1 December. In addition, fully vaccinated South Koreans and Japanese who hold a valid visa will be able to enter the country without having to quarantine.
- New Zealand Prime Minister Jacinda Ardern has announced that the entire country will enter the "traffic light system" from 3 December, ending the previous "alert level system".

=== 24 November ===
- New Zealand's COVID-19 Response Minister Hipkins has announced that Indonesia, Fiji, India, Pakistan and Brazil will be removed from the "Very High-Risk" classification, easing restrictions on travelers from those countries. However, Papua New Guinea will remain under the "Very High Risk" classification, limiting entry to NZ citizens and residents.
- Hipkins confirmed that New Zealand's managed isolation and quarantine (MIQ) restrictions would be eased in three stages in 2022. From 17 January, all fully vaccinated New Zealanders and other eligible travellers from Australia will be exempt from MIQ. From 14 February, all fully vaccinated New Zealanders and other eligible travellers from all other countries will be exempt from MIQ. From 30 April, all fully vaccinated travellers will be exempt from MIQ.
- The New Zealand Parliament passed the COVID-19 Response (Vaccinations) Legislation Act 2021, allowing businesses to dismiss employees who refuse to be vaccinated against COVID-19.

=== 26 November ===
- The New Zealand Government has required that all members of the New Zealand Police and New Zealand Defence Force be vaccinated against COVID-19 by 17 January 2022.

=== 30 November ===
- The Fijian Government began rolling out Moderna COVID-19 vaccine booster shots to frontline workers and vulnerable Fijians.

== See also ==
- Timeline of the COVID-19 pandemic in November 2021
- Responses to the COVID-19 pandemic
