= Francine Ntoumi =

Congolese parasitologist

- Born: 1961 (age 64–65); Brazzaville, Republic of the Congo
- Scientific career
- Fields: Parasitology
- Workplaces: Congolese Foundation for Medical Research Bill and Melinda Gates Foundation GISAID Regional Hub (Central Africa) Marien Ngouabi University Multilateral Initiative Against Malaria

Francine Ntoumi Ph.D., HDR, PvDz, FRCPedin (born 1961) is a Congolese parasitologist specializing in malaria. She was the first African person in charge of the secretariat of the Multilateral Initiative on Malaria (2006-2010). In recent years, she has become involved in research on other infectious diseases, including COVID-19.

== Early life and education ==
Francine Ntoumi was born in 1961 in Brazzaville, Republic of the Congo. Her father was an electrical engineer (one of the first in the Congo) and her mother was a neonatal nurse. She is the eldest of five siblings and the only girl.

Ntoumi received her primary education in Brazzaville. She moved to France for her BEPC degree, which she earned in 1975, and her baccalauréat, which she earned in 1978 from the Lycée Marie Curie de Sceaux. She earned her bachelor's degree in biology in 1989, then her doctorate in 1992 from the Université Pierre et Marie Curie.

== Career ==
After earning her Ph.D., Ntoumi began her molecular immunology and epidemiology research on malaria at the Pasteur Institute of Paris. She took a position in Franceville, Gabon, as a researcher at the International Center for Medical Research in 1995, and remained there until 2000. That year, she became the Head of Laboratory at the Medical Research Unit of the Albert Schweitzer Hospital in Lambaréné, Gabon, and the Institute of Tropical Medicine, University of Tübingen. She remained in these positions until 2005. Between 2006 and 2007, Ntoumi was the Scientific Director of the European Developing Countries Clinical Trials Partnership (EDCTP), located in The Hague, Netherlands. She then led the Secretariat of the Multilateral Initiative Against Malaria in Dar es Salaam, Tanzania, until 2010, as its first African leader.

Ntoumi has worked to reinforce the African continent's public health research capacity, through efforts coordinating the Central Africa Network on Tuberculosis, HIV/AIDS, and Malaria (CANTAM). She is a member of many scientific committees, including the Global Health Scientific Advisory Committee of the Bill and Melinda Gates Foundation. She leads the GISAID Regional Hub in Central Africa, facilitating international collaboration on SARS-CoV-2 sequencing and other disease research.

Ntoumi is the President of the Congolese Foundation for Medical Research (FCRM), which she founded in 2008, which helped to establish the University Marien Ngouabi's first laboratory for molecular biology. Ntoumi is a senior lecturer at University Marien Ngouabi and has also been an associate professor at the University of Tübingen since 2010. Since 2014, she has been a professor and researcher at the Marien Ngouabi University.

Ntoumi is involved in a programme “to make science a female ambition” in Africa, which aims to promote gender balance in science.

== Publications ==
Ntoumi has published over 180 peer-reviewed papers in journals including Proceedings of the National Academy of Sciences of the United States of America (PNAS) and Nature Genetics.

== Other activities ==
- Africa Research Excellence Fund (AREF), Member of the Advisory Panel (since 2015)
- Barcelona Institute for Global Health (ISGlobal), Member of the External Advisory Committee
- Bill and Melinda Gates Foundation, Member of the Global Health Scientific Advisory Committee
- European Vaccine Initiative (EVI), Member of the Scientific Advisory Committee
- Fondation Mérieux, Member of the Scientific Advisory Board
- GISAID, Member of the SAC Nomination Committee
- International AIDS Vaccine Initiative (IAVI), Member of the Board of Directors
- The Global Health Network (TGHN), University of Oxford, Member of the Scientific Advisory Board
- World Health Organization (WHO), Member of the African Advisory Committee for Research and Development

== Honors and awards ==
Ntoumi was the first Sub-Saharan African woman to receive the Georg Foster prize, for her work creating networks to combat infectious diseases across Africa. She has also been lauded for her leadership and education of scientists across Sub-Saharan Africa. Ntoumi has also been awarded a fellowship of the African Academy of Science.

Other awards include:

- Réseau International des Congolais de l'Extérieur (RICE) prize (2012)
- African Union Kwame Nkrumah Award for Scientific Excellence (Regional), African Union (2012)
- Georg Forster Research Award, Alexander Von Humboldt Foundation (2015)
- Scientific Award of the Republic of the Congo (2016)
- Christophe Mérieux Prize, Institut de France (2016)
- Fellow, Royal College of Physicians (elected 2016)
- National Order of Scientific Research (2017)
