= James M. Jay =

American microbiologist (1927–2008)

James M. Jay (1927–2008) was an American microbiologist who taught at Southern University and Wayne State University with a Ph.D. in bacteriology and biochemistry.

== Early life ==
On September 12, 1927, James Monroe Jay was born to parents Lizzie W. Jay and John B. Jay in Fitzgerald, Georgia. He grew up alongside three siblings: Gertrude Henley, Reverend Lewis W. Jay, and Joseph Jay. From a young age, Jay had expressed an interest in nature and life science. Although this was different from his parents' expectations, they supported his wishes. In 1945, Jay graduated high school before serving in the military until 1947, where he earned a sergeant ranking. From here, Jay attended Paine College, graduating in 1950 with a bachelor's in natural sciences and math, and with a cum laude title. Leaving Augusta, Georgia, after a brief chemistry study at Western Reserve University, Jay transferred to Ohio State University to study bacteriology. He earned his master's in science in 1953, and continued to receive a Ph.D. in bacteriology and biochemistry in 1956. After receiving his Ph.D., Jay stayed at Ohio State under a postdoctoral fellowship with the Department of Agricultural Biochemistry the following school year. Along the way, James M. Jay married his wife Patsie Jane Jay and had three children named Mark Jay, Alicia Jay White, and Byron Jay.

== Career ==
After his fellowship, Jay taught at Southern University in 1957, until moving to teach at Wayne State University in 1961. He then moved to Henderson, Nevada and actively practiced scientific investigations, focusing on E.coli, out of his home laboratory. He also became an adjunct professor and served in the Department of Biological Services at the University of Nevada Las Vegas in 1994. He joined the International Association for Food Protection (IAFP) in 1982, and, in 1995, he delivered the Ivan Parkin Lecture for the 82nd annual meeting.

== Awards ==
- The National Organization for the Advancement of Chemists and Chemical Engineers granted him the Percy L. Julian Award.
- The Society for Industrial Microbiology granted him the Outstanding Teacher Award.
- Wayne Status University granted him the Distinguished Graduate Faculty Award in 1992.
- IAFP granted him the Fellow Award in 1999.

== Legacy ==
Since its publication and subsequent seven revisions since 1970, James M. Jay has been well known for his book, Modern Food Microbiology. Along with his book, Jay has published almost 70 research papers that continue to be cited. IAFP created an award to honor James M. Jay because of his status as a member of the organization and his advancements, both in research of food safety and diversity in the field. The James M. Jay Diversity in Food Safety Award honors a nominated IAFP member who has made developments in this science.
