= École supérieure de biotechnologie Strasbourg =

Scientific organization in France

Coordinates: 48°31′32″N 7°44′16″E

The French École supérieure de biotechnologie Strasbourg, also called European School of Biotechnology, Strasbourg (ESBS) is a scientific college situated in Illkirch (Greater Strasbourg). It was founded in 1982 as an autonomous institute within the University of Strasbourg and offers an international biotechnology program.

In the year of 1988 the ESBS signed a convention on founding the European Confederation of the Upper Rhine Universities (German: Konvention zur Gründung einer Europäischen Konföderation der Oberrheinischen Universitäten, EUCOR), an initiative established by Professor Werner Arber, a Nobel Prize Laureate (Medicine) and Principal of the University of Basel, Switzerland. This makes it one of the Écoles Européennes des Universités du Rhin Supérieur (German: Europäische Schulen der Oberrheinischen Universitäten). Within the framework of this cooperation, the ESB Strasbourg is funded by:

- the Albert Ludwigs University of Freiburg im Breisgau, Germany
- the University of Basel, Switzerland
- the University of Strasbourg (formerly Université Louis Pasteur, responsible for administration of the ESBS), France

== Program ==
The complete biotechnology program takes three years. Students with a prediploma in chemistry, biology, biotechnology, engineering or any other science can apply. The application process includes compulsory interviews held at the four partner universities. Forty students are accepted each year .

The trilingual education requires students to have solid knowledge of German, French and English. Most of the courses are held at Strasbourg, but attending courses at the other universities involved is also part of the program.

The final degree is the French the master's degree “Diplôme d'Ingénieur en Biotechnologie” plus the EUCOR (confederation of the universities of upper Rhin) diploma in biotechnology (French, German and Swiss).

== History ==
The ESBS was founded by the professors Jean-Pierre Ebel and Pierre Chambon in 1982 following the model of the existing French engineering schools. The first director was Bruno Jarry, who established the structure and philosophy of the school. Under the directorship of Richard Lathe and Jean-Francois Lefevre, the ESBS in 1987 was officially registered by the Ministry of National Education and Research. The further development of the ESBS was under the direction of Claude Kedinger, who oversaw the move to Illkirch; the ESBS moved from the University Strasbourg I Louis-Pasteur to a newly constructed building in the district of Illkirch in 1994 to become part of the technology campus. Since then, the capacities for students have been extended and several independent research laboratories have joined the Institute.

== Awards ==
- 2003: Prix Bartholdi: Bi-/Trinational education programs
- 2003: DaimlerChrysler Services Preis

== See also ==
University of Freiburg Faculty of Biology
