= Journal of Food Protection =

- Discipline: Food safety, food science
- Language: English
- Edited by: Panagiotis Skandamis

Publication details
- History: 1937–present
- Publisher: Elsevier
- Frequency: Monthly
- Open access: Yes
- License: CC-BY
- Impact factor: 2.8 (2024)

Standard abbreviations
- ISO 4: J. Food Prot.

Indexing
- CODEN: JFPRDR
- ISSN: 0362-028X (print); 1944-9097 (web)
- LCCN: 2023210403
- OCLC no.: 888469370

Links
- Journal homepage; Online archive

Journal of Food Protection is a monthly peer-reviewed open-access scientific journal that covers original research in food science. It is published by Elsevier and is the official journal of the International Association for Food Protection. The editor-in-chief is Panagiotis Skandamis (Agricultural University of Athens).

== Abstracting and indexing ==
The journal is abstracted and indexed in:

- Chemical Abstracts Service
- MEDLINE/PubMed
- Science Citation Index Expanded
- Scopus

According to the Journal Citation Reports, the journal has a 2024 impact factor of 2.8.
