= Jean-Pierre Lecocq =

Belgian molecular biologist and entrepreneur (1947–1992)

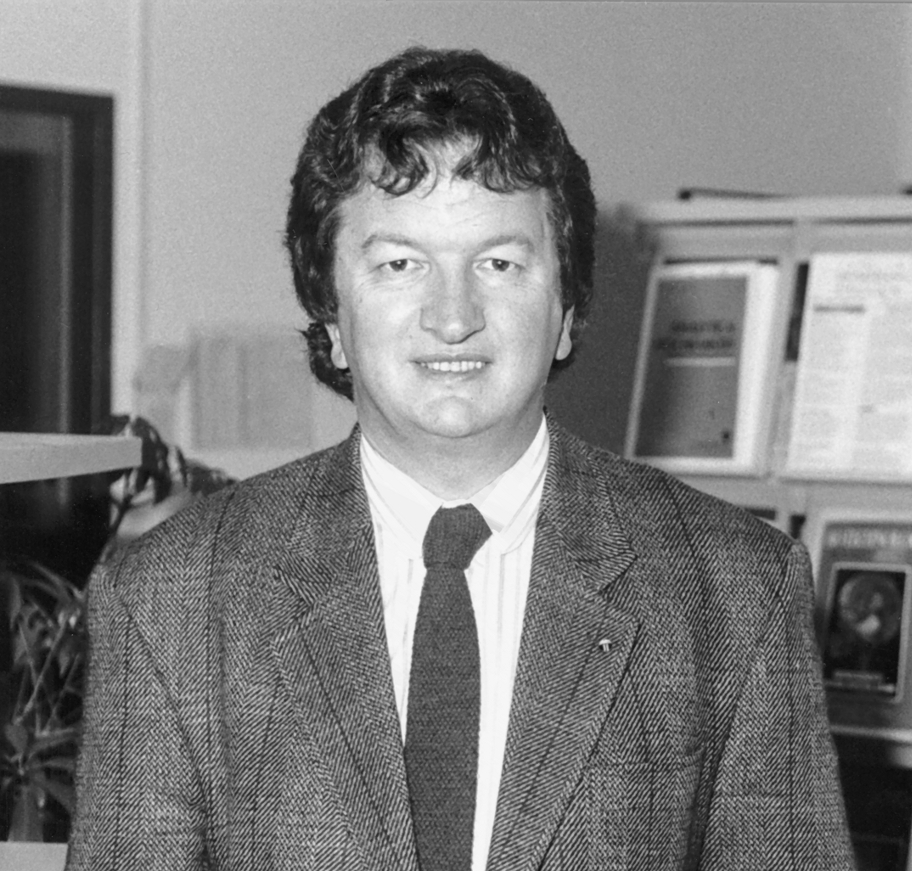
- Jean-Pierre Lecocq (about 1990)
- Born: Jean-Pierre Willy Georges Ghislain Lecocq; 17 July 1947; Gosselies, Hainaut Province, Wallonia, Belgium
- Died: 20 January 1992 (aged 44); Barr, Bas-Rhin, Alsace, France
- Resting place: Cimetière de Frasnes-lez-Gosselies, Les Bons Villers, Belgium; 50.52775°N 4.4441°E
- Children: 2
- Scientific career
- Fields: Molecular biology

Jean-Pierre Willy Georges Ghislain Lecocq (17 July 1947 – 20 January 1992) was a Belgian molecular biologist and entrepreneur.

== Education ==
Lecocq was born in Gosselies/Charleroi but grew up in Nivelles. In 1965, he received a scholarship to study Chemistry at the Free University of Brussels. In 1969, he graduated with honors (avec grande distinction). Starting in 1969, he worked on his doctoral thesis in the laboratory of Prof. René Thomas, Département de Biologie Moléculaire, on the interactions between a prokaryote (Escherichia coli) and a virus (bacteriophage lambda). Lecocq identified new bacterial genes influencing the decision between the lysogenic cycle and lysis and he analyzed mutants of RNA polymerase. From 1974 to 1975, Lecocq was drafted into the military, but returned to research to finish his PhD in 1975 with summa cum laude (la plus grande distinction). Until early 1977, he continued working at the Free University in Brussels as a post-doc (Chargé de Recherche) with short research stays in the USA (Madison, Wisconsin) and Canada (Laval University, Quebec).

== Professional career ==
From 1977 to 1980, in the early years of the rapidly developing field genetic engineering, Lecocq was project manager in the Department of Genetics of the pharmaceutical company SmithKline RIT, in Rixensart, Belgium, where he set up a molecular biology laboratory and directed the research on vaccines against enteropathogenic E. coli strains, and hepatitis B virus.

In 1980, he was appointed Scientific Director of Transgène, one of the first biotechnology companies in France, that was founded in Strasbourg in 1979 at the initiative of Prof. Pierre Chambon and Dr. Philippe Kourilsky, the goal being to develop new technologies in biomedical research for industrial applications. In 1984, Lecocq became vice president and in 1990 President of Transgène.

After Transgène was acquired in 1991 by the Mérieux group, Lecocq also became Corporate Director of Research and Development of the Pasteur-Merieux-Connaught Group, based in Lyon.

Lecocq died at age 44 in the crash of Air Inter Flight 148 on 20 January 1992 at Mont Sainte-Odile, Alsace. He left behind his wife Mireille and two children.

=== Research ===
From 1980 until 1992, Lecocq established French and international collaborations between Transgène, academic institutions and industry.
Under his leadership secretory and non-secretory expression systems for the production of recombinant proteins in E. coli, Saccharomyces cerevisiae, Baculovirus and mammalian cells in cell culture were developed and recombinant virus technology was established. A Hybridoma Laboratory provided for the development of monoclonal antibodies for analyses (ELISA) and immunoaffinity chromatography. Conventional as well as HPLC methods for downstream purification and analysis of the produced peptides, proteins and glycoproteins were established.
These technologies have been applied, among others, to the following projects: a new concept based on vaccinia virus for a rabies vaccine in the wild (Raboral, in November 1991 awarded with the Rhone Poulenc Prize for Innovation and used in several countries for the vaccination of foxes, and raccoons), recombinant versions of Factor VIII and Factor IX for the treatment of hemophilia A on behalf of the French blood transfusion service CNTS; vaccine candidates for schistosomiasis, toxoplasmosis and babesia canis; recombinant hirudin, α-1-antitrypsin, gamma-interferon and interleukins, and variants thereof, construction of virtually all recombinant proteins of HIV-1, HIV-2 and SIV for mechanistic studies and applications in diagnosis, and immunization; characterization of α-thrombin receptor, mechanisms of cystic fibrosis.

=== Publications ===
Between 1970 and 1991, Lecocq published 130 papers, 15 additional publications about subjects and projects initiated by Lecocq appeared from 1992 onwards.
The following is a selection of representative publications:

- J.P. Lecocq (doctoral thesis) Étude génétique et biochimique de la régulation de la transcription Dépt. de Biologie Moléculaire, Université Libre de Bruxelles (1975)
- J.P. Lecocq, C. Dambly, R. Lathe, C. Babinet, A. Bailone, R. Devoret, A.M. Gathoye, H. Garcia, M. Dewilde and T. Cabezon Nomenclature and location of bacterial mutations modifying the frequency of lysogenisation of E.coli by lambdoïd phages Molec. Gen. Genet. 145, 63-64 (1976)
- J.P. Lecocq, M. Zubowski and R. Lathe Cloning and expression of viral antigens in Escherichia coli and other microorganisms in: "Methods in Virology" (1984), 7, 121–172, K. Maramorosch, H. Koprowski, eds, Academic Press Inc, Orlando, Florida.
- M. Courtney, S. Jallat, L.H. Tessier, A. Benavente, R.G. Crystal and J.P. Lecocq Synthesis in E. coli of alpha1-antitrypsin variants of therapeutic potential emphysema and thrombosis Nature 313, 149-151 (1985)
- H. de la Salle, W. Altenburger, R. Elkaim, K. Dott, A. Dieterlé, R. Drillien, J.P. Cazenave, P. Tolstoshev and J.P. Lecocq Active gamma-carboxylated human factor IX expressed using recombinant DNA techniques Nature 316, 268-270 (1985)
- R.P. Harvey, E. Degryse, L. Stefanie, F. Schamber, J.P. Cazenave, M. Courtney, P. Tolstoshev and J.P. LecocQ Clonig and expression of a cDNA coding for the anticoagulant hirudin from the bloodsucking leech, hirudo medicinalis Proc. Natl. Acad. Sci. USA, 83, 1084-1088 (1986)
- A. Capron, R. Pierce, J.M. Balloul, J.M. Grzych, C. Dissous, P. Sondermeyer and J.P. Lecocq Protective antigens in experimental schistosomiasis Acta Tropica 44, 63-69 (1987)
- G. Rautmann, M.P. Kieny, R. Brandely, K. Dott, M. Girard, L. Montagnier and J.P. Lecocq HIV-1 core proteins expressed from recombinant vaccinia viruses AIDS Res. Hum. Retroviruses (1989) 5, 147–57.
- M.P. Kieny, J.P. Lecocq, M. Girard, Y. Rivière, L. Montagnier and R. Lathe Tailoring the human immunodeficiency virus envelope glycoprotein to improve immunogenicity in: Vaccines 89, R.A. Lerner, H. Ginsberg, R.M. Chanock, F. Brown, Cold Spring Harbor Laboratory, 177-183 (1989)
- J.P. Van Eendenburg, M. Yagello, M. Girard, M.P. Kieny, J.P. Lecocq, E. Muchmore, P.N. Fultz, Y. Rivière, L. Montagnier and J.C. Gluckman Cell-mediated immune proliferative responses to HIV-1 of chimpanzees vaccinated with different vaccinia recombinant viruses AIDS Res. Hum. Retroviruses (1989) 5, 41–50.
- T. Faure, A. Pavirani, P. Meulien, H. de la Salle, G. Mignot, H. van de Pol, M. Courtney and J.P. Lecocq Stable expression of coagulation factors VIII and IX in recombinant Chinese hamster ovary cells Advances in Animal Cell Biology and Technology for Bioprocesses (1989), R.E. Spier, J.B. Griffiths, J. Stephenne, P.J. Crooy, Butterworths, England, 481–487.
- M.F. Cesbron-Delauw, B. Guy, G. Torpier, R.J. Pierce, G. Lenzen, J.Y. Cesbron, H. Charif, P. Lepage, F. Darcy, J.P. Lecocq et al. Molecular characterization of a 23-kilodalton major antigen secreted by Toxoplasma gondii Proc. Natl. Acad. Sci. USA, 86, 7537-7541 (1989)
- B. Brochier, M.P. Kieny, F. Costy, P. Coppens, B. Bauduin, J.P. Lecocq, B. Languet, G. Chappuis, P. Desmettre, K. Afiademanyo, R. Libois and P.P. Pastoret Large-scale eradication of rabies using recombinant vaccinia-rabies vaccine Nature 354, 520-522 (1991)
- M.A. Rosenfeld, W. Siegfried, K. Yoshimura, K. Yoneyama, M. Fukayama, L.E. Stier, P.K. Paakko, P. Gilardi, L.D. Stratford-Perricaudet, M. Perricaudet, S. Jallat, A. Pavirani, J.P. Lecocq and R.G. Crystal Adenovirus-Mediated transfer of a recombinant alpha-1-antitrypsin gene to the lung epithelium in vivo Science, 252, 431-434 (1991)
- U.B. Rasmussen, V. Vouret-Craviari, S. Jallat, Y. Schlesinger, G. Pages, A. Pavirani, J.P. Lecocq, J. Pouyssegur and E. Van Obberghen-Schilling cDNA cloning and expression of a hamster alpha-thrombin receptor coupled to Ca2+ mobilization FEBS Lett. 288, 123-128 (1991)
- J.M. Reichart, I. Petit, M. Legrain, J.L. Dimarq, E. Keppi, J.P. Lecocq, J.A. Hoffmann and T. Achstetter Expression and Secretion in Yeast of Active Insect Defensin, an Inducible Antibacterial Peptide from the Fleshfly Phormia terranovae Invert. Reprod. and Dev., 21, 15-24 (1992)
- M.A. Rosenfeld, K. Yoshimura, B.C. Trapnell, K. Yoneyama, E.R. Rosenthal, W. Dalemans, M. Fukayama, J. Bargon, L.E. Stier, L.D. Stratford-Perricaudet, M. Perricaudet, W.B. Guggino, A. Pavirani, J.P. Lecocq and R.G. Crystal In vivo Transfer of the Human Cystic Fibrosis Transmembrane Conductance Regulator Gene to Airway Epithelium Cell, 68, 143-155 (1992)

=== Editorial boards ===
Lococq was on the editorial boards of the following journals:

- Cell (USA) since 1983
- Gene (USA) since 1983
- European Journal of Epidemiology (Italy) since 1985
- Protein Engineering (U.K.) since 1986
- Journal of Biological Standardization (WHO) since 1989

=== Memberships ===
Lecocq was a member of the following organizations:

- Société Belge de Biochimie since 1970
- European Molecular Biology Organization(EMBO)since 1985
- Conseil Scientifique des Institut National de la Recherche Agronomique (INRA) since 1986
- Advisor of the World Health Organization (WHO) in Geneva since 1986
- Comité National de Biochimie: Section des Représentants Français des Industries Biologiques et Biochimiques since 1986
- Conseil Scientifique de l'Université Louis Pasteur, Strasbourg since 1986
- Conseil Scientifique de l'Association Française de Médecine Préventive since 1986
- Comité d'Orientation de la Délégation Régionale de l'ANVAR France since 1986
- Comité Académique des Applications de la Science (CADAS) since 1988

== Fondation Jean-Pierre Lecocq ==
"Jean-Pierre has left us, victim of the Strasbourg airplane accident. This is a tragedy and an immense loss for our Institute. He was a friend for many of us. For all of us he leaves a memory of a warm, simple, generous man and one of a great scientist recognized and appreciated worldwide." ALAIN MÉRIEUX

To honor the achievements and the person, in 1992 the Fondation Jean-Pierre Lecocq was created, which since 1994 (and until the year 2020) awards a bi-annual prize for "new and significant research achievements in molecular biology and their application".

== Bibliography ==
- Obituary in Molecular Microbiology (1992) 6 (11), pp 1577–1578
- P. Chambon, M. Courtney, P. Kourilsky, R. Lathe (1992) In Memoriam. Jean-Pierre Lecocq, 1947-1992 Gene 118, pp 1–2
- R. Lathe (1992) Jean-Pierre Lecocq: A Personal Tribute Gene 118, pp 3–4
- F. Horaud (1992) Obituary: Jean-Pierre Lecocq, 1947–1992 Biologicals 20, p 89
- Archive of Transgène SA, Boulevard Gonthier d’Andernach, Parc d’Innovation, F-67405 Illkirch Graffenstaden Cedex, France.
