= Air Inter Flight 148 =

1992 aviation accident in France

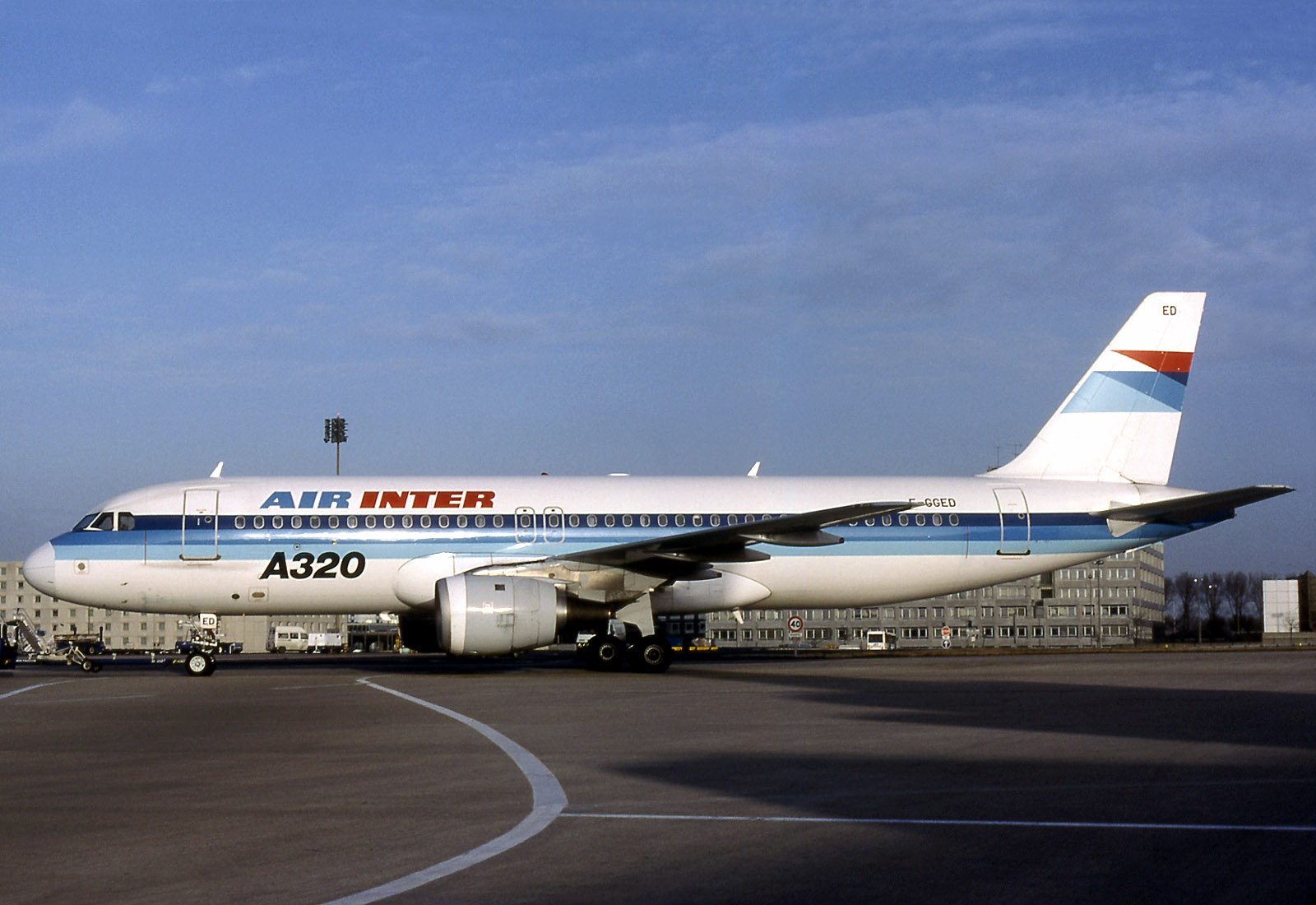
- F-GGED, the aircraft involved in the accident, seen in 1991

Accident
- Date: 20 January 1992
- Summary: Controlled flight into terrain due to ATC error and pilot error; poor training and safety standards
- Site: Mont Sainte-Odile, west of Barr, 10.5nm S/W of Strasbourg Airport, Strasbourg, France; 48°25′31″N 007°24′18″E

Aircraft
- Aircraft type: Airbus A320-111
- Operator: Air Inter
- IATA flight No.: IT5148
- ICAO flight No.: ITF148DA
- Call sign: AIR INTER 148 DELTA ALPHA
- Registration: F-GGED
- Flight origin: Lyon Satolas Airport, Lyon, France
- Destination: Strasbourg Airport, Strasbourg, France
- Occupants: 96
- Passengers: 90
- Crew: 6
- Fatalities: 87
- Injuries: 9
- Survivors: 9

Air Inter Flight 148 (Note: ICAO call sign ITF 148 DA, IATA Air Inter Flight 5148 — This incident is widely known as Mt St Odile crash) was a scheduled passenger flight from Lyon-Saint-Exupéry Airport (formerly known as Lyon Satolas Airport) to Strasbourg Airport in France. On 20 January 1992, the Airbus A320 operating the flight crashed into the slopes of the Vosges Mountains in Eastern France, near Mont Sainte-Odile, while on a non-precision approach to Strasbourg Airport. A total of 87 of the 96 people on board were killed, while the remaining 9 were all injured.

== Accident ==
Flight 148 was commanded by 42-year-old Captain Christian Hecquet, with 8,800 flight hours, including 162 flight hours on the Airbus A320, & 37-year-old First Officer Joël Cherubin, with 3,600 flight hours, including 61 hours on the A320. The aircraft left Lyon-Satolas (now called Lyon-Saint-Exupéry Airport) at 17:20 UTC. Both pilots were relatively new to the A320, with a combined total of only 300 hours in the aircraft, but they both were familiar with Strasbourg Airport as both had flown into the airport many times.

As the flight neared Strasbourg Airport, they informed ATC of their desire to follow the ILS approach for Runway 23 until the airport was in sight, followed by a visual approach onto Runway 05. This type of approach onto Runway 05 was common at Strasbourg Airport; Runway 05 was not equipped with ILS since the nearby mountains and high terrain would interfere with the glide slope signal transmitted by the ILS. ATC denied the pilots approach request, saying there would be a significant delay because of conflict with several aircraft departing on Runway 05 and instead offered vectors for the VOR/DME approach for Runway 05, which the pilots accepted. The flight was cleared to descend to 5,000 ft and vectored to the ANDLO waypoint 11 nautical miles from the Strasbourg Airport VOR. ATC cleared the aircraft onto the final approach at 18:19 UTC as it passed ANDLO, where the pilots turned left onto the runway heading of 050 degrees and continued to descend as per the approach chart.

At 18:20:33 UTC, Flight 148 crashed into the slopes of Mont Sainte-Odile at 2,620 ft, 10.5 nautical miles from the airport. The search and rescue operation commenced at 18:40. Three helicopters, 24 motorcycles, and 950 people from the Police Nationale, National Gendarmerie, Sécurité Civile, as well as 24 amateur radio operators, participated in the search and rescue operation. Although almost 1,000 people were involved in the search effort, it was criticised for being unprepared and disorganised, as it was not clear which of the three agencies would lead the search for the crash site, hampering the search and rescue effort. The crash site was not discovered until 22:35 UTC (4 hours and 15 minutes later) when a group of journalists were led to the wreckage by a surviving passenger, Nicolas Skourias. The first rescuers, a group of gendarmes, arrived at 22:49 after being led to the wreckage by the same survivor and a journalist.

== Cause ==
The Bureau of Enquiry and Analysis for Civil Aviation Safety (BEA) found that Flight 148 crashed because the pilots left the autopilot set in Vertical Speed Mode, which uses feet per minute to determine descent rates, instead of Flight Path Angle Mode, which uses the angle of the aircraft in flight, and then set "33" for "3.3° descent angle. At the time, the display showing the descent rate in feet only showed the first two digits, so 3,300 feet per minute would be displayed as 33, not 3300. As a result, instead of a gradual 3.3° of descent, the aircraft instead entered a high descent rate of 3,300 ft (1,000 m) per minute until it impacted the mountain.

The pilots had no warning of the imminent impact because Air Inter had not equipped its aircraft with a ground proximity warning system (GPWS) or ground proximity warning system (GPWS) installed but did not Switched On. At the time, a GPWS was not required on A320 aircraft. It is speculated that the lack of a GPWS was because Air Inter, facing strong competition from France's TGV high-speed trains, may have encouraged its pilots to fly fast at low level (up to 350 kn [650 km/h; 400 mph] below 10,000 ft [3,000 m], while other airlines generally do not exceed 250 kn [460 km/h; 290 mph]), and flying at those increased speeds at low altitudes caused a GPWS to give too many nuisance warnings.

== Aircraft ==
The aircraft involved, manufactured in 1988, was an Airbus A320-111, registered as F-GGED, with serial number 015. At the time of the accident, the aircraft had accumulated a total of 6,316 airframe hours & 7,194 takeoff and landing cycles.

== Aftermath ==
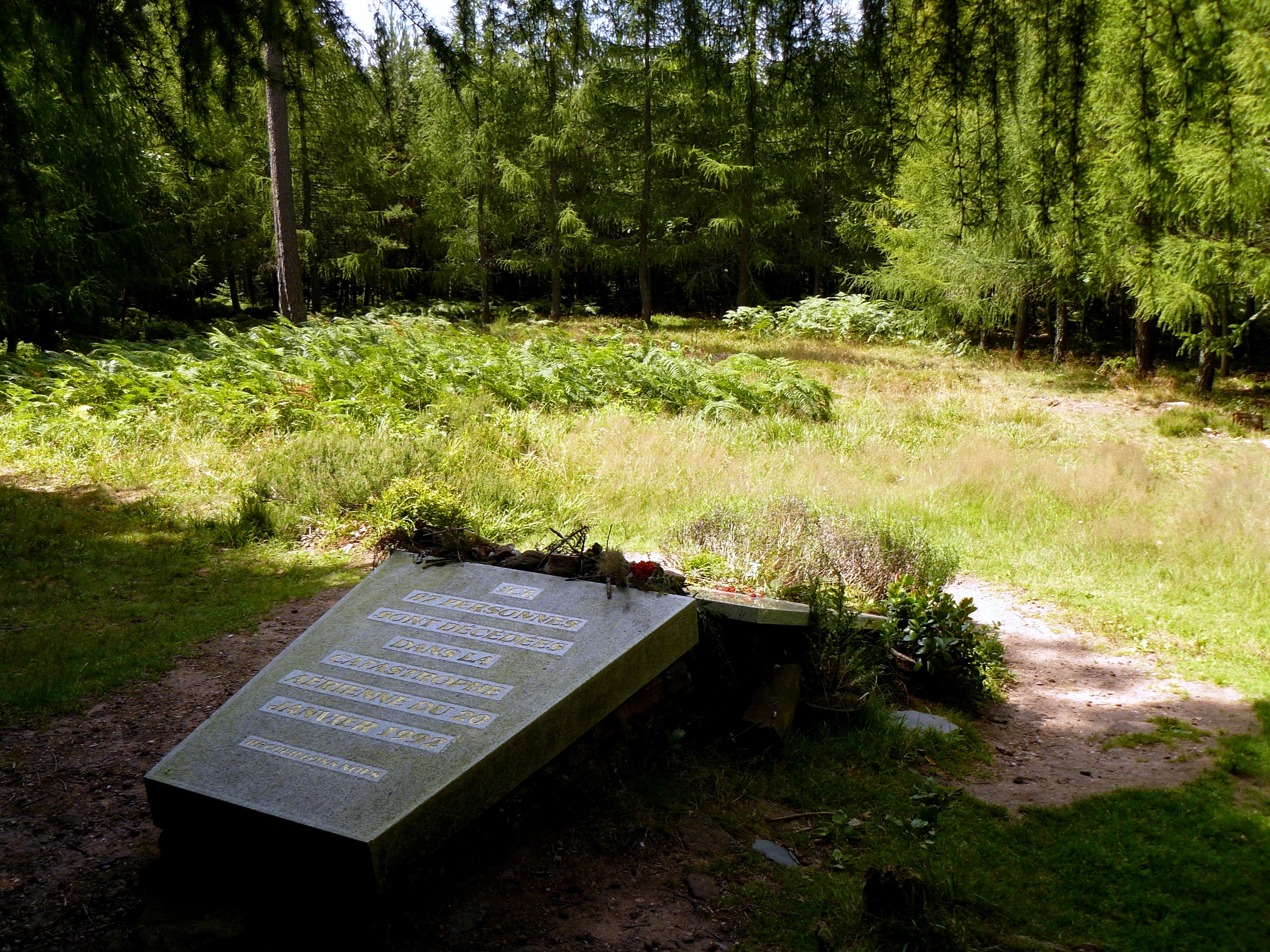
The crash site of Flight 148 with a memorial plaque

Accident investigators recommended 35 changes in their report. Airbus modified the interface of the autopilot so that a vertical speed setting would be displayed as a four-digit number, preventing confusion with the Flight Path Angle mode. The flight data recorder, which was destroyed before investigators could obtain any data, due to extended exposure to the post-crash fire, was upgraded so that it could withstand higher temperatures for a longer period of time. The report also recommended that pilot training for the A320 should be enhanced, and that ground proximity warning systems should be required to be installed on all A320 aircraft as part of the minimum equipment list. Air Inter equipped its aircraft with ground proximity warning systems before the investigation was completed.

== Notable deaths ==
- Jean-Pierre Lecocq, Belgian molecular biologist and entrepreneur.

== Dramatization ==
The story of the disaster was featured on the ninth season of the Cineflix television show Mayday in the episode titled "The Final Blow" (also known as Air Crash Investigation as the episode titled "Crashed and Missing" or "Doomed to Fail" (S09E07)).

It is also featured in season 2, episode 5, of the TV show Why Planes Crash, in an episode called "Sudden Impact".
