= VITEK =

Autotomated microbiology analyzer

VITEK refers to a series of automated microbiology analyzers for microbial identification (ID) and antibiotic sensitivity testing (AST).

== History ==
Vitek was developed in the 1960s between NASA and the defense contractor McDonnell Douglas. For the Voyager program, McDonnell Douglas developed a Microbial Load Monitor (MLM) to detect bacterial contamination aboard the spacecraft. Under a subsequent NASA contract, McDonnell Douglas explored expanding the MLM to detecting and identifying bacterial infections among the crew of a human mission to Mars. The initial system was called the Microbial Load Monitor (MLM) and could detect nine common pathogens of Urinary tract infections (UTIs). In 1977, a new subsidiary was formed around the product, Vitek Systems, and the system was renamed the VITEK meaning "life technology", a portmanteau of Latin Viv, meaning life, and TEK being short for technology. In 1979, Vitek began selling the AutoMicrobic System (AMS) to hospital laboratories.

In 1989, Vitek Systems was sold to bioMérieux.

In March 2005, the Vitek 2 Compact received FDA clearance.
