= Ellen 't Hoen =

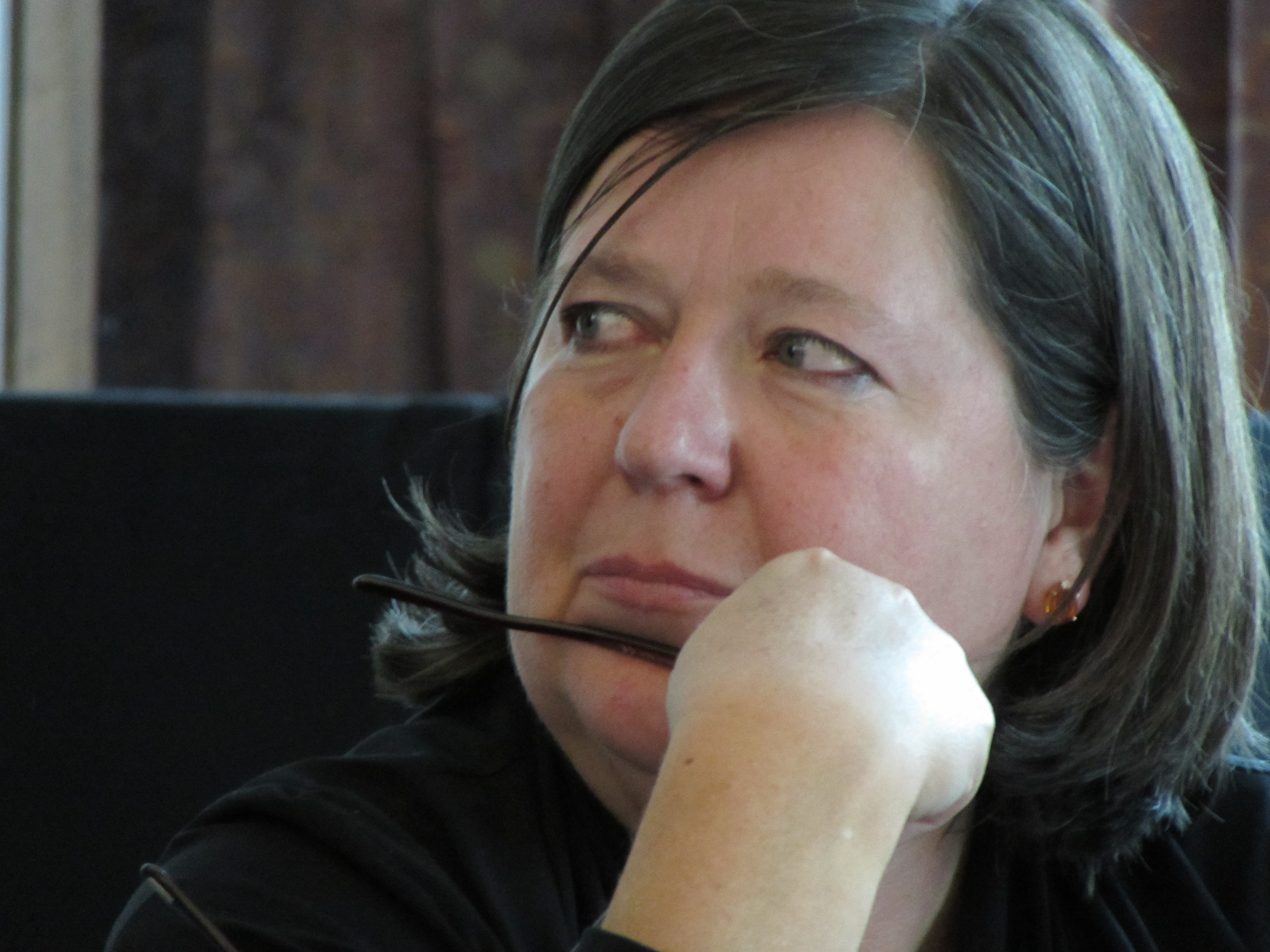

Ellen F. M. 't Hoen (born 1960) is an international medical activist. She is an expert in medicines policy and intellectual property law and has been a consultant to a number of countries and international organisations. In 2005 and 2006 she was listed as one of the 50 most influential people in intellectual property in the world by the journal Managing Intellectual Property.

't Hoen trained as a lawyer – earning a master's degree from Amsterdam University – and a social worker. However, she has spent the main part of her professional life as an activist for patients rights and more equitable pharmaceutical policies.

She won several awards for her work on the effects of exposure to the drug diethylstilbestrol (DES) in the 1980s and 1990s, including the prestigious Harriet Freezerring award in 1989. In 1981 she co-founded DES Action the Netherlands.

In 1990 she joined Health Action International to head the policy and campaigns unit. From 1996 until 1999 she was the international coordinator of the independent medicines journal La Revue Prescrire/Prescrire International and the International Society of Drug Bulletins (ISDB).

She joined Médecins sans Frontières in 1999. Until end 2008 't Hoen was the policy and advocacy director of the Médecins sans Frontières' campaign for the access to essential medicines. At the 61st World Health Assembly in 2008, 't Hoen coined the phrase "pharma fraud" for use in discussions and resolutions involving illegal activities in the manufacturing, marketing, and distribution of pharmaceuticals.

Until May 1, 2012, 't Hoen was the first executive director of the Medicines Patent Pool, co-founded by UNITAID.

She is currently also a research fellow at the University of Amsterdam doing research on the implementation of the Doha Declaration on TRIPS and Public Health.
