= Labover =

French biotechnology company

Labover is a French biotechnology firm which specializes in laboratory construction.

== History ==
Labover was established in 1953.

Since 2000, Labover has supplied more than 20 of its BSL3 truck-trailer laboratory units, primarily to French research institutes or to French military hospitals.

In 1994, Labover joined with two other companies to broaden their offer to supply complete turnkey laboratories aimed at the French market. In 1997, the ISO9000 catalogue included autoclaves, furnaces, and furniture, and was targeted to research, institutional and teaching environments.

Sometime prior to October 2003, four tractor-trailer BSL-3 units were sold to the Palestinian Authority.

In October 2004, Labover was the beneficiary of a Franco-Chinese agreement that led to the donation of four of its truck-trailer BSL-3 laboratory units. The contract was worth €3.2m. The devices are contained on a Mercedes-Benz truck chassis within a 40-foot TEU. A second 20-foot TEU holds the electrical power and water purifier unit.

Labover supplied the necessary acetone, ethanol, acetonitrile (HPLC grade) and ethyl acetate to scientists at the IBMM in Montpellier for a 2014 paper.

In a 2019 review article, Zhiming Yuan of the Chinese Academy of Sciences and China's premier infectious diseases investigations unit (the Wuhan Institute of Virology) mentioned the Labover facilities that were copied and improved over a ten-year period such that the Chinese could now help the government of Sierra Leone with Chinese-standardized mobile units in their battle against Ebola. Yuan said that "the standardization of laboratory biosafety management in China" helped by Labover "provides legal and technical guaranteed on-set operations" and thus was born a Chinese success story that is now sold to the world. Fifteen years after the initial purchase of a handful of Labover mobile units, China had self-constructed over 100 new BSL3 units.
