= Charles Mérieux =

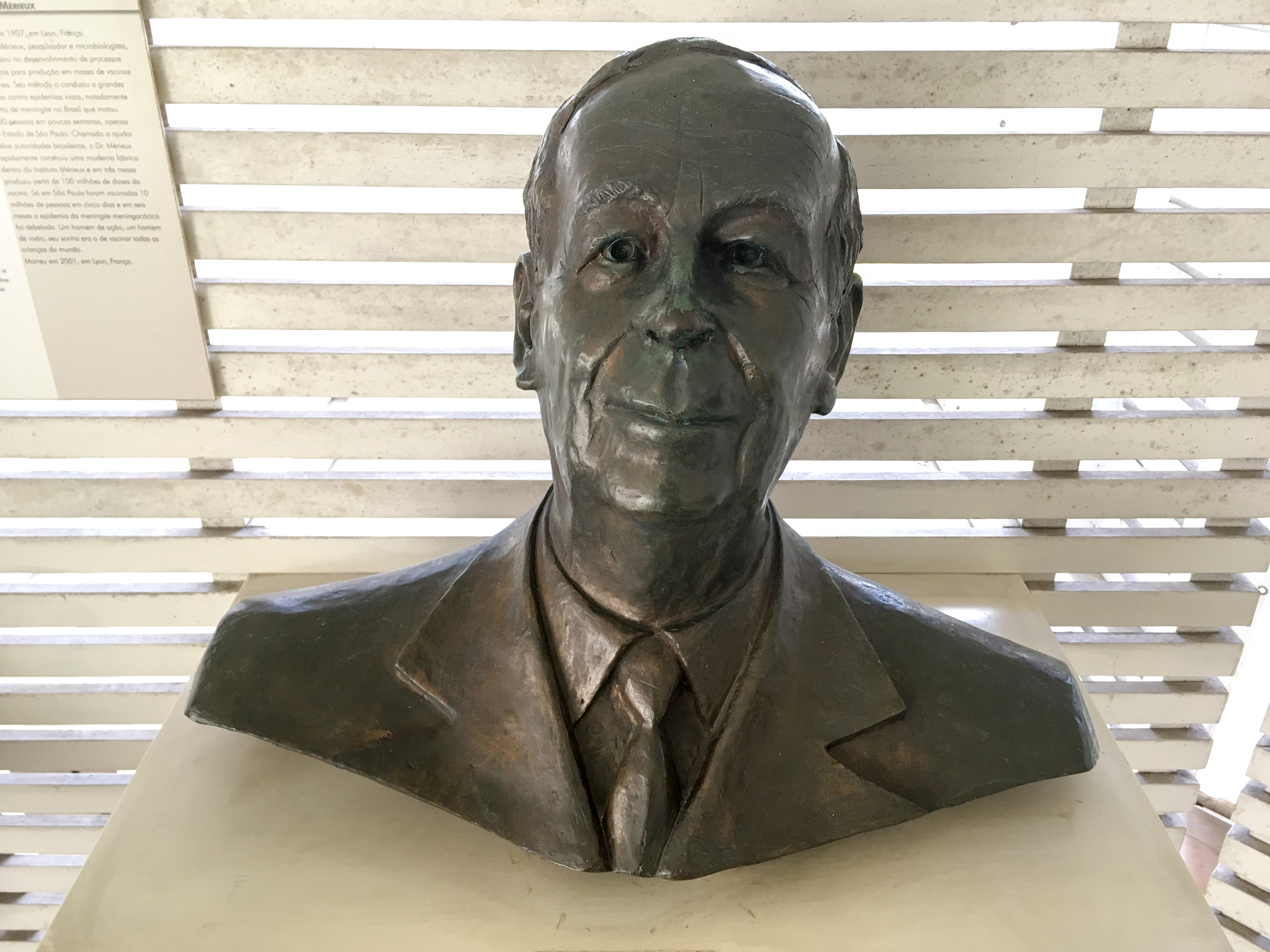
- Bust of Charles Mérieux at the Instituto Butantan in São Paulo, Brazil
- Born: 9 January 1907; Lyon, France
- Died: 18 January 2001 (aged 94); Lyon, France
- Occupation: Virologist
- Known for: Industrial vaccine production, founder of Bioforce Développement
- Children: Alain Mérieux, Nicole de Beublain
- Parent: Marcel Mérieux

Charles Mérieux (9 January 1907 – 18 January 2001) was a French virologist and industrialist who pioneered large-scale vaccine production and contributed to major global public health initiatives.

== Early life ==
Mérieux was born in Lyon, the younger son of Marcel Mérieux, a microbiologist and former assistant to Louis Pasteur. His elder brother Jean was originally intended to succeed their father at the laboratory founded in 1897, but died from meningitis contracted during research work. He trained in medicine at the Pasteur Institute in Paris before joining the family enterprise following his father's death in 1937.

== Career ==
During the Second World War, Mérieux established a blood transfusion centre for the French Resistance and organised nutritional support for undernourished children. After the war, he studied blood purification techniques in the United States, but later turned to veterinary virology when French policy restricted commercial handling of human blood.

He developed a method to culture the foot-and-mouth disease virus in vitro, enabling industrial-scale vaccine production. This innovation led to large-scale manufacture of human vaccines, including the Salk and Sabin polio vaccines, and later vaccines against rabies, rubella, diphtheria, and tetanus. In 1974 he directed the production of 100 million meningitis vaccine doses to combat an epidemic in Brazil, an effort that immunised about 90 million people.

Mérieux collaborated with virologist Hilary Koprowski to develop a safer rabies vaccine cultivated in non-neural tissue. He also promoted the concept of “vaccinology”, integrating logistics and delivery systems into immunization campaigns.

== Later life and death ==
In the 1980s, Mérieux founded Bioforce Développement, an organisation training health professionals for epidemic response, and established a teaching centre in collaboration with the Centers for Disease Control and Prevention. He sold a controlling stake of the family business, the Institut Mérieux, to Rhône-Poulenc in 1968. The acquisition was completed in 1994. Mérieux died in Lyon on 18 January 2001 at the age of 94. He was survived by his son Alain Mérieux, a daughter, 11 grandchildren and 18 great-grandchildren.
