= Medicines Patent Pool =

International organisation

- Formation: July 2010
- Headquarters: Geneva
- Chair of the Governance Board: Marie-Paul Kieny
- Executive Director: Charles Gore
- Website: https://medicinespatentpool.org/

The Medicines Patent Pool (MPP) is a Unitaid-backed internat

ional organisation founded in July 2010, based in Geneva, Switzerland. MPP's mandate is to accelerate access to affordable quality treatments for people living with HIV, hepatitis C and tuberculosis, as well as HIV-associated co-morbidities. Since 2018, MPP has expanded its mandate to other patented essential medicines on the World Health Organization's (WHO) Model List of Essential Medicines (EML) and medicines with strong potential for future inclusion on the EML. In 2020, MPP expanded its mandate to include COVID-19 treatments. In 2021, MPP expanded its mandate into the licensing of technology with an initial focus on COVID-19 vaccines and pandemic preparedness.

Peer-reviewed economics research finds that the MPP substantially increased generic drug supplies, especially in countries with stronger patent protection; a positive spillover effect to upstream innovation is found in clinical trials and drug product approvals in MPP-related drugs. A related study found that there is an immediate and large increase in licensing of a life-saving drug in low- and middle-income countries (LMIC) when the patent is included in the MPP. An article in The Conversation has summarized issues in the patent system, relevance to LMIC, and the role of the MPP.

== Creation ==
The United Nations-backed Medicines Patent Pool Foundation was established as an independent legal public health entity in July 2010 with the support of Unitaid and has been fully operational since November 2010.

The MPP was established in response to the global HIV/AIDS epidemic, which reached a crisis in LMIC countries that were unable to access essential patented medicines. In 2006, Médecins Sans Frontières (MSF) presented the idea of patent pool to the French Foreign Ministry and UNITAID. The MSF proposal was for an entity that would be dependent on patent holders—"particularly private pharmaceutical companies"—voluntarily agreeing to allow LMIC countries access to their licensed essential medicines. UNITAID was first developed under the impetus of France in 2006, as a "new drug purchasing facility for HIV, TB and malaria" medications. UNITAID provided "innovative solutions" to "overcome access and innovation barriers for HIV medicines".

It is based on the idea that patents are intended to reward innovation, and that unless licensed, a patent can also prevent the production or sale of affordable, quality-assured generic medicines and the development of novel formulations. The Medicines Patent Pool negotiates with patent holders for licences on HIV, hepatitis C and tuberculosis medicines. These licences permit lower-cost manufacturers to distribute patented medicines in developing countries. Licences also provide the freedom to develop new treatments better suited for resource-limited settings, such as paediatric formulations and fixed-dose combinations. Competition among many manufacturers should bring prices down supporting treatment scale-up.

== Financing ==
The Medicines Patent Pool was founded and is funded by Unitaid, a global health initiative that is working with partners to end HIV/AIDS, malaria, tuberculosis and hepatitis C and works to allow more affordable generic medicines to enter the marketplace in low- and middle-income countries. UNITAID provided the initial $US 4 million to set up MPP in 2010. In its first grant phase 2010–2015, the MPP worked exclusively in the HIV field and in December 2014, Unitaid approved another funding package for MPP to continue its HIV work through 2020. In November 2015, the MPP mandate was expanded to hepatitis C and tuberculosis treatment. The Medicines Patent Pool was the first and is now the only independent patent pool that aims to tackle the issue of access to HIV/AIDS, hepatitis C and tuberculosis drugs in low- and middle-income countries.

== Structure ==
The MPP has two governing bodies: a Governance board (i.e.Executive Board) composed of 9 members and an Expert Advisory Group comprising 12 members, it also works with ad hoc experts.

The current Chair of the Governance Board is World Health Organization (WHO)'s former Assistant Director-General for Health Systems and Innovation Marie-Paule Kieny, who succeeded Sigrun Møgedal, chair since March 2016 and Charles Clift, the MPP's founding chairman. Past executive directors includes Charles Gore (2018), Greg Perry (2013–2017), Ellen 't Hoen (2010–2012).

== Activities ==
The Medicines Patent Pool negotiates public-health driven licences with patent holders, and sub-licenses to generic manufacturers to encourage the sale of lower-cost generic versions of medicines in over a hundred developing countries.

In October 2012, the MPP, Gilead Sciences and the UN National Institutes of Health/University of Illinois were honoured by the Licensing Executives Society (United States and Canada) (LES) for licence agreements that expand access to affordable HIV medicines in developing countries. The LES's annual "Deals of Distinction" Awards are presented to notable intellectual property agreements in five industry sectors and the three parties were recognised for precedence-setting licensing agreements dedicated to improving public health under the Industry-University-Government Interface category.

By 2013, MPP in collaboration with ViiV Healthcare granted 14 voluntary licences generics companies for low-cost versions of abacavir used to treat children living with HIV. As of 2018, the Medicines Patent Pool holds licences for 13 HIV antiretrovirals, an HIV technology platform, 2 hepatitis C direct-acting antivirals and 1 investigational treatment for tuberculosis from patent holders AbbVie, Bristol-Myers Squibb, Gilead Sciences, MSD, ViiV Healthcare, Johns Hopkins University, the University of Liverpool, the US National Institutes of Health and Pharco Pharmaceuticals. The MPP also worked with Janssen and Boehringer Ingelheim to extend their non-assert policies for paediatric darunavir formulations and nevirapine, ensuring that the companies will not assert their patent rights in many more developing countries. The organisation signed an agreement with F. Hoffmann-La Roche to increase access to valganciclovir, an important treatment for an HIV opportunistic infection.

In 2018, the foundation announced a new five-year strategy to improve access to medicines in low- and middle-income countries, which supports international public health goals for HIV, tuberculosis and hepatitis C.

In 2021 deals have been achieved with Merck and Pfizer to allow the manufacture Molnupiravir and Paxlovid without paying royalties in poorer countries.

== See also ==
- Doha declaration
- Proprietary drug
- COVAX
