= Alain Mérieux =

French businessman

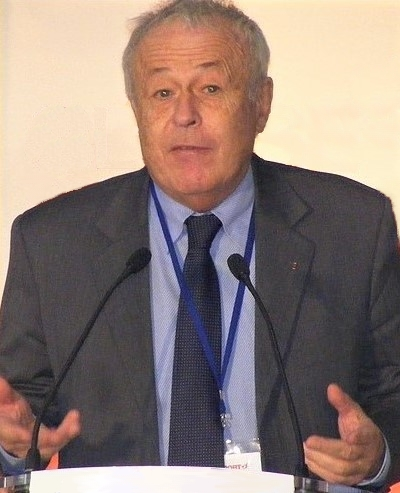
- Mérieux in 2010
- Born: 10 July 1938 (age 87); Lyon, France
- Education: University of Lyon; Harvard Business School
- Occupation: Businessman
- Title: Chairman, Institut Mérieux
- Spouse: Chantal Berliet
- Children: 3
- Parent(s): Charles Mérieux; Simone Perréart

Alain Mérieux (born 10 July 1938) is a French billionaire businessman, chairman of Institut Mérieux and politician.

== Early life ==
Alain Mérieux is the son of Charles Mérieux (1907–2001), and the grandson of Marcel Mérieux (1870–1937), who founded Institut Mérieux in 1897.

== Career ==
Alain Merieux has also been involved in political activities in France, where he was first vice-president of the board of the Rhone-Alpes region from 1986 until 1998, where he was in charge of foreign relations, economic development, research and secondary education.

== Personal life ==
Mérieux lives in Lyon, and is married with three children. In 2006, his eldest son, Christopher died of a heart attack. His middle son, Rudolph died in 1996 in a plane crash. As of 2 December 2021, Bloomberg estimated Mérieux's net worth to be US$8.80 Billion which make him the 277th richest person in the world.

== See also ==
- Mérieux family
