= Mérieux family =

Family of entrepreneurs from Lyon in France

The Mérieux family is an entrepreneurial dynasty from Lyon, France, owners of the Institut Mérieux holding, founders of companies such as Sanofi Pasteur, bioMérieux (in vitro diagnostics) and Mérial (veterinary activity), but also of the foundations Fondation Merieux|Fondation Marcel-Mérieux and Fondation Christophe et Rodolphe Mérieux, of the Jean Mérieux P4 laboratory and of humanitarian organisation Bioforce.

== Genealogy ==
- Marcel Mérieux (1870–1937), ESCIL student in 1891, former assistant to Pasteur, founder in 1897 of Mérieux Biological Institute in Lyon (origins of the Institut Mérieux holding) in 1897 (now part of Sanofi Pasteur)
  - Jean Mérieux, his elder son. Physician, died at 26 of tuberculosis-related meningitis contracted in the family laboratory.
  - Charles Mérieux (1907–2001), physician and entrepreneur. Founder of Fondation Marcel-Mérieux, humanitarian organisation Bioforce and P4 laboratory Jean Merieux.
    - Jean Mérieux, died in a car accident in 1994.
    - Alain Mérieux (born 1938), doctor of pharmacy and entrepreneur, founder of bioMérieux.
      - Christophe Mérieux (1967–2006), physician.
      - Rodolphe Mérieux (1969–1996), crash victim onboard TWA Flight 800.
      - Alexandre Mérieux (born 1974), administrator of the bioMérieux group.

== Bibliography ==
- Lyon - La malédiction des Mérieux (Le Point) (in French)
