= Transgene (company) =

Transgene S.A.
- Type: Public (S.A.)
- Traded as: Euronext Paris: TNG
- Industry: Biotechnology; Life science
- Founded: December 1979
- Founders: Pierre Chambon; Philippe Kourilsky
- Headquarters: Illkirch-Graffenstaden, France
- Key people: Dr Alessandro Riva (President and CEO as of 2023)
- Website: www.transgene.fr

Transgene S.A. is a French biotechnology company founded in 1979. It is based in Illkirch-Graffenstaden, near Strasbourg, Alsace. The company develops and manufactures immunotherapies for the treatment of cancer. Based on viral vectors, these therapies stimulate the immune defenses of patients to specifically target cancer cells.

Transgene has two technological platforms based on these respective approaches: individual therapeutic vaccines, shared antigens cancer vaccines oncolytic viruses.

Transgene's portfolio consists of four products currently in clinical development. Its lead product TG4050, a neoantigen individualized therapeutic cancer vaccine is currently being developed in a randomized Phase I/II trial in the adjuvant treatment of head and neck cancer.

The company is listed on the regulated market of Euronext in Paris.

== History ==
Transgene was founded in 1979, on the initiative of Pierre Chambon and Philippe Kourilsky. Jean-Pierre Lecocq was the first Scientific Director of Transgene in 1980.

Dr Alessandro Riva, MD, joined Transgene in 2022 as Chairman of the Board of Directors. In May 2023 the board appointed him Chairman and Chief Executive Officer of the company^{,}.

== Technological platforms ==
Transgene owns two technological platforms:

- Invir.IO is a technology platform based on the patented oncolytic viruses that replicate only in cancer cells. The genome of these viruses has been modified to express anti-tumor therapies directly within the tumor.
- The myvac® platform is based on an MVA vector which safety, biological activity and ability to induce an immune response against tumor antigens are established and recognized. The platform enables the design of personalized viruses based on each patient's tumor mutations. Transgene selects around 30 neoantigens per patient, based on the AI of its partner NEC, and then encodes them into viral DNA.

== Products in development ==
The Company has several clinical-stage products in its portfolio.

1- TG4050 : This neoantigen individualized therapeutic cancer vaccine is currently being developed in a randomized Phase I/II trial in the adjuvant treatment of head and neck cancer.

2- TG4001 : is a therapeutic vaccine designed to express the E6 and E7 antigens of the HPV-16 virus (human papillomavirus type 16). Transgene is currently evaluating the full study results in detail to determine the best way forward for this program.

3- Oncolytic viruses: TG6050 and BT-001. Transgene's oncolytic viruses are designed to directly and selectively destroy the cancer cells by using an oncolysis mechanism, while also inducing immune responses against tumor cells. In addition, during their replication, the virus expresses the payloads integrated in its genome and therefore allows the expression of immunomodulators and/or therapeutic agents specifically in the tumors^{,}^{,}^{,}^{,}.

4- Transgene and AstraZeneca have been collaborating since 2019 to co-develop oncolytic viruses from the Invir.IO™ platform.

== Management Committee ==
Transgene's Management Committee is composed of the following members:

- Alessandro Riva, Chairman & Chief Executive Officer (CEO)
- Hedi Ben Brahim, Chairman & Chief Executive Officer (CEO);
- Éric Quéméneur, Executive Vice-President, Chief Scientific Officer (CSO);
- Christophe Ancel, Vice-President Pharmaceutical Operations & Qualified Pharmacist;
- Maud Brandely-Talbot, Vice-President Medical Affairs, Chief Medical Officer (CMO);
- Jean-Philippe Del, Vice-President, Chief Financial Officer (CFO);
- Thibaut du Fayet, Vice-President Corporate Development;
- John Felitti, Vice-President, General Counsel, Corporate Secretary;
- Gaëlle Stadtler, Vice-President, Human Resources Director.
