= Institut Mérieux =

French holding company

Institut Mérieux is a French holding company owned by the Mérieux family from Lyon.

== History ==
It was created by Marcel Mérieux in 1897 under the name Institut Biologique Mérieux (Mérieux Biological Institute). The vaccine development branch of the institute was separated early on and is now part of Sanofi Pasteur.^{,}^{,} The current name was changed in 2009 from Mérieux Alliance. The holding is owned through the Mérieux Alliance company at 68% by Alain and Alexandre Mérieux and at 32% by the Christophe and Rodolphe Mérieux foundation (different from the Mérieux foundation).

Alongside diagnostic activities, Alain Mérieux develops new complementary bio-industrial activities. The holding company then took in 1994, the control of Transgene, specialized in gene therapy, then of Silliker (specialized in food security), in 1998. In 2001, Biomérieux acquired the diagnostic company Organon Teknika. Its Advanced Bioscience Laboratories Inc. sector, a contract research company, is then bought by the Mérieux family holding company.

In 2010, the institute structured its nutrition and health division around Silliker and Biofortis under the name of Mérieux NutriSciences.

In January 2020, Institut Mérieux co-founded the Hub VPH, the first global hub in veterinary public health, whose objective is to catalyze the driving forces of research, innovation, education and industry in the Auvergne-Rhône-Alpes region around this activity.

== Holding ==
Through creations and acquisitions, the holding is managing the following companies:^{,}^{,}

- BioMérieux, created by Alain Mérieux in 1963, owned at 59%
- Mérieux NutriSciences, renamed from the acquired Chicago-based company Silliker, and encompassing the Biofortis and Bioagri companies, owned at 70% by the holding
- Transgene "designs and develops therapeutic vaccines and immunotherapy products to treat cancers and infectious diseases" and is owned at 55% by the holding
- Advanced BioScience Laboratories, Inc, an unlisted company dedicated to research and development of infectious diseases, AIDS in particular; owned entirely by the holding
- Mérieux Développement
- IMAccess, a not for profit company dedicated to the development, production and supply of rapid diagnostic tests to developing countries, owned entirely by the holding
