= Philippe Kourilsky =

French biologist

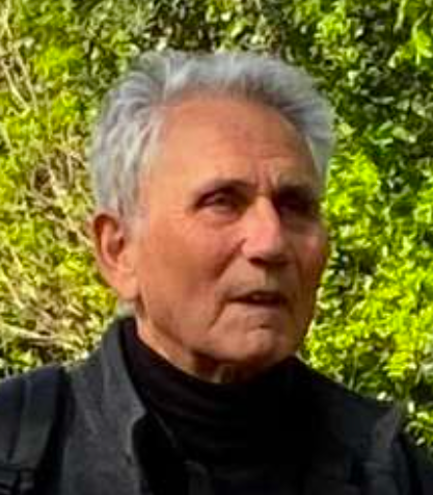
Philippe Kourilsky

Philippe Kourilsky, born on 22 July 1942 in Boulogne-Billancourt, is a French biologist, a member of the French Academy of sciences and an honorary professor at the Collège de France.

== Biography ==
Son of Raoul Kourilsky, professor of medicine, and Simone Kourilsky, also a doctor, Philippe Kourilsky devoted himself to biology after studying mathematics and physics at the École polytechnique. For his doctorate, he chose as thesis director the biologist François Gros,.

== Professional background ==
Kourilsky spent most of his career at the Centre national de la recherche scientifique, as a research director. He was elected correspondent of the French Academy of sciences (section of molecular and cellular biology, genomics) in 1990, then member in 1997.

In 1998, he was appointed professor at the Collège de France, where he held the chair of molecular immunology until 2012. Professor at the Institut Pasteur on 1 January 2000, he was appointed Director General; a position he resigned from on 31 July 2005.

Kourilsky has also been a member of Academia Europaea since 1992, and a member of the Foresight Committee of the Veolia Institute. He became editor-in-chief of the digital journal FACTS Reports, launched in 2007 with the support of the same institute.

In 2010, he founded the Resolis association, of which he has been president since then.

== Research studies ==
He has held numerous responsibilities in the administration of research and applications of genetics and immunology in the public and private sectors. He is the author of a report on the precautionary principle, submitted to the Prime Minister in 2006.

== Distinctions ==
1980: Member of EMBO

1986: International Prize for Immunopathology

1990: Lacassagne Prize of the Collège de France

1998: Officier of the Légion d'Honneur

2000: International Prize for Research in Medical Sciences

2001: Doctor honoris causa of the University La Sapienza in Rome

2001: Commandeur of the National Ordre du Mérite

2005: Doctor honoris causa from the University of Quebec

2009: Commandeur of the Légion d'Honneur.

2015: Grand Officer of the National Ordre du Mérite

== Publications ==
- Les promesses de l'immunologie
- Le Jeu du hasard et de la complexité: La nouvelle science de l'immunologie, Odile Jacob, 2014.
- Philippe Kourilsky, Le manifeste de l'altruisme, Odile Jacob, Paris, 2011.
- « Vaccination : quand l’éthique devient immorale », Pour la Science, Paris, 2004, n^{o} 322, p. 8-11.
  ... Such deviations are already being observed, as is the case for a component of HIV combination therapies, Tenofovir, for which a clinical trial (detailed in the article on Tenofovir) in Cameroon has made a sad reputation
- Du bon usage du principe de précaution, Odile Jacob, 2002.
- La science en partage, Odile Jacob, 1998.
