= International Association for Food Protection =

Non-profit organization

- Abbreviation: IAFP
- Formation: 1911
- Type: INGO
- Location: Des Moines, Iowa, US
- Region served: Worldwide
- Official language: English
- Website: IAFP Official website

The International Association for Food Protection (IAFP), founded in 1911, is a non-profit association of food safety professionals based in Des Moines, Iowa. The organization claims a membership of over 3,000 members from 50 nations.

The association provides its members with an information network on scientific, technical, and practical developments in food safety and sanitation through its two scientific journals, Food Protection Trends and Journal of Food Protection, its annual meeting, and interaction with other food safety professionals.

Before 2000, it was known as the International Association of Dairy and Milk Inspectors (1911–1936), International Association of Milk Sanitarians (1936–1947), and International Association of Milk and Food Sanitarians, Inc. The name was changed in 1966 to the International Association of Milk, Food and Environmental Sanitarians. In 1999, it received the current name.

== History ==
In the early 20th century, an increasing number of cities and states in the US passed policies to ensure the safety of milk. The laws were a response to the food industry's deception at that time. There were types of alteration in milk products on the market, such as water dilution or adding butter or cheaper substitutes. In addition, spoiled milk is a danger to health: the infant mortality rate was lower in cities that had monitored milk production and sale. The association was established in 1911 and was based in Milwaukee, Wisconsin, and there were 35 members. One of the members was from Canada, and one from Australia; the rest were from the US. According to the Association's constitution, the object is to develop "uniform and efficient inspection of dairy farms, milk establishments, milk and milk products" by "men who have a thorough knowledge of dairy work."

In 1923, the Association deemed pasteurization as necessary for processing milk products and endorsed pasteurization as the only adequate safeguard for milk supplies. The US Public Health Service's annual report on milk-borne outbreaks decreased from 40–60 per year in the 1920s to about 20 per year after World War II.

In the 1960s, the association expanded its vision on food protection from milk safety. As the president of the association pointed out in 1960, "Today, we sanitarians must be equipped to deal with problems extending throughout the entire range of environmental health. We must solve problems of waste disposal, insect and rodent control, air pollution, housing, radiological poisoning, and many others. Additionally, with more Americans eating out more often than ever before, the food service industry has become an area of responsibility such as would have been impossible for our founding Members to imagine. Recently, the packaging of prepared foods of the 'heat and eat' variety has developed as a rapidly expanding industry that poses new sanitation problems for you to solve." The name of the association was changed after a mail ballot of members at large in response to the expanded scope of the association, the International Association of Milk, Food and Environmental Sanitarians (IAMFES).

== Black Pearl Award ==
The IAFP gives an annual Black Pearl Award "in recognition of a company's outstanding achievement in corporate excellence in food safety and quality." It has been awarded since 1994. The majority of recipients have been American companies, but Canadian and German companies have also won.

== Annual meeting ==
The IAFP annual meeting is held annually and has an attendance of over 3,600 people from U.S. and foreign local and federal governments, academia, food safety consultants and the food industry.
