= Sanofi Pasteur =

French vaccines manufacturing division of Sanofi

Coordinates: 45.727°N 4.8437°E

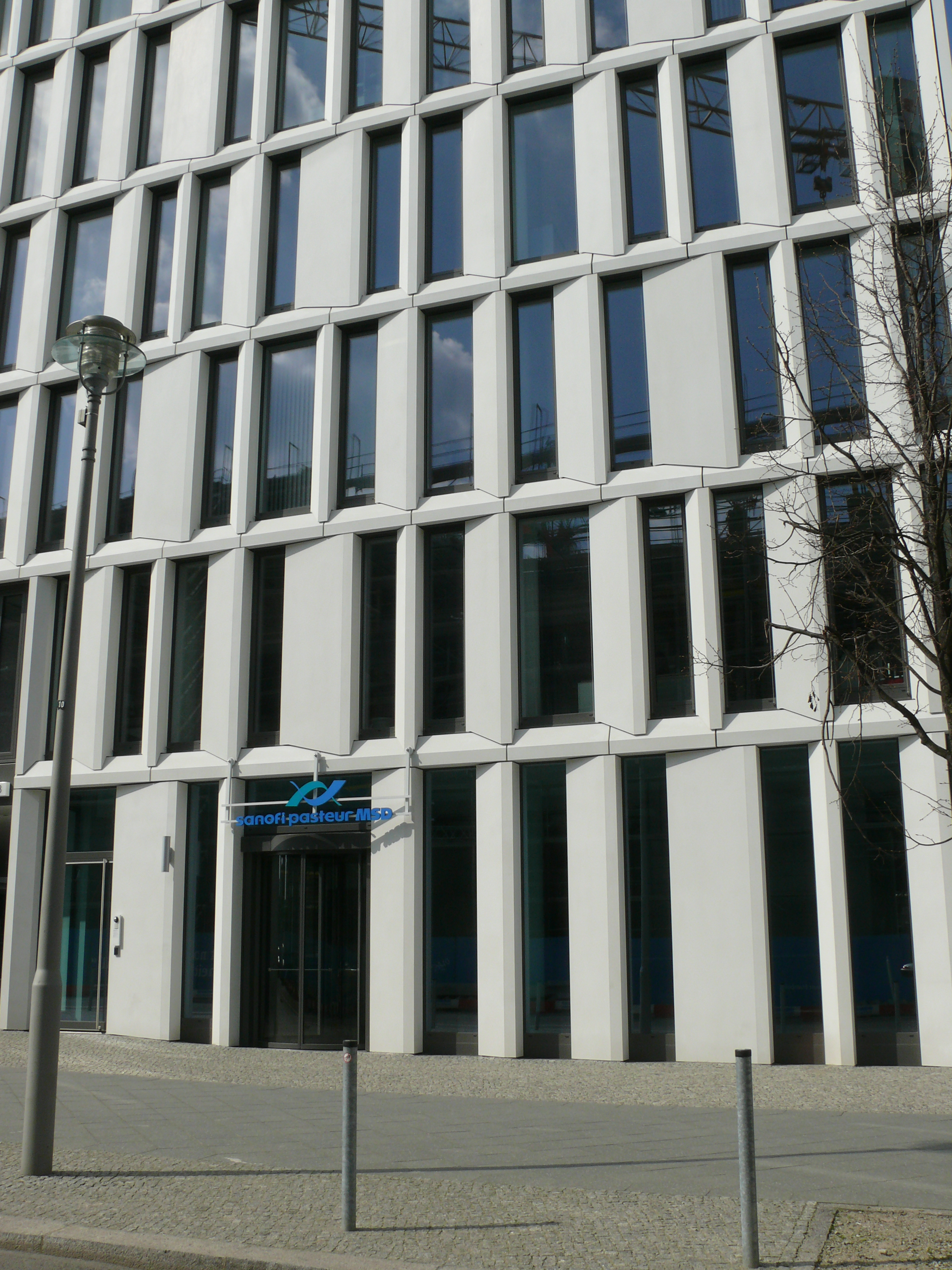
- Company type: Division
- Founded: August 2004; 21 years ago by merger
- Headquarters: 14 Espace Henry Vallée, Lyon, France
- Key people: David Loew (EVP, Vaccines)
- Revenue: €4.74 billion (2015)
- Number of employees: 15,000
- Parent: Sanofi

Sanofi Pasteur is the vaccines division of the French multinational pharmaceutical company Sanofi. Sanofi Pasteur is the largest company in the world devoted entirely to vaccines. It is one of four global producers of the yellow fever vaccine.

== History ==
Since 1992, Sanofi Pasteur has sponsored Sanofi Biogenius Canada (SBC), a national, biotechnology-focused science competition for Canadian high school and CEGEP students. Those selected for the SBC work with local mentors, giving students hands-on research experience in a professional lab setting. Participants compile their results and present their findings at regional competitions. Cash prizes are awarded and regional winners advance to the National stage, where they vie for the top spot and the chance to compete in the International BioGENEius Challenge, held at the prestigious BIO International Convention – the largest biotechnology event in the world.

In 2004, Aventis merged with and into Sanofi. The new Sanofi-Aventis Group became the world's 3rd largest pharmaceutical company. Aventis Pasteur, the vaccine division of Sanofi-Aventis Group, changed its name to Sanofi Pasteur. In 2014, Sanofi Pasteur stopped producing its effective Fav-Afrique antivenom because competition from cheaper though less powerful competitors made it unprofitable. Doctors Without Borders said that it would take two years to develop a similar antivenom, and that existing stocks would run out in June 2016.

In the fall of 2011 the Sanofi Pasteur plant flooded, causing problems with mold. The facility, located in Toronto, Ontario, Canada, produced BCG vaccine products made with the Glaxo 1077 strain, such as a tuberculosis vaccine and ImmuCYST, a BCG immunotherapeutic and bladder cancer drug. By April 2012 the FDA had found dozens of documented problems with sterility at the plant including mold, nesting birds and rusted electrical conduits, as well as numerous procedural safety issues and violations. The resulting closure of the plant for over two years resulted in shortages of bladder cancer and tuberculosis vaccines. On October 29, 2014 Health Canada gave the permission for Sanofi to resume production of BCG.

The Philippine Department of Health began in 2016 a programme in three regions to vaccinate schoolchildren against dengue fever, using Dengvaxia supplied by Sanofi Pasteur. On 29 November 2017, Sanofi issued a caution stating that new analysis had shown that those vaccinated who had not previously been infected with dengue ran a greater risk of infection causing severe symptoms. On 1 December 2017, the Philippine DOH placed the programme on hold, pending review. Over 700,000 people had received at least one vaccination at that point. Since the announcement by Sanofi, at least 62 children have died, allegedly after receiving a vaccination. The victims' parents blamed the dengue vaccine for the deaths of their children.

In July 2020, Sanofi Pasteur announced that it would begin phase three testing of a COVID-19 vaccine in several countries, including Mexico, and that the cost would be US $7 to $10 per dose. If data are positive, a global phase 3 study could start in Q2 2021. If the vaccine meets clinical requirements on safety and effectiveness, approved by regulatory authorities, a vaccine can expected in the fourth quarter of 2021. One of the vaccines ordered by the Netherlands for the mass anti-coronavirus vaccination programme in 2021 seems not to work well in elderly people and the development of the vaccine will face delays.

In 2021, Sanofi Toronto announced it was seeking to start a new Biosafety level 3 laboratory.

=== Key dates ===
- 1897: Marcel Mérieux creates the Mérieux Biological Institute in Lyon. Richard Slee creates the Pocono Biological Laboratories, in Swiftwater, Pennsylvania in the U.S.
- 1914: John G. FitzGerald creates Connaught Laboratories, part of the University of Toronto.
- 1968: Rhône-Poulenc acquires 51% of the capital of the Institut Mérieux.
- 1974: Pasteur Institute creates Pasteur Production, a subsidiary specializing in manufacturing vaccines.
- 1978: Connaught Laboratories in Canada acquires the vaccine manufacturing facility (Merrell-National Laboratories) at Swiftwater, Pennsylvania, U.S.
- 1985: Pasteur Production is acquired by the Mérieux Institute, and Pasteur Vaccins is created.
- 1989: The Mérieux Institute acquires the Connaught Laboratories in Canada and its subsidiaries and becomes a world leader in human biology.
- 1990: Creation of Pasteur Mérieux Serums & Vaccins.
- 1994: Pasteur Mérieux Sérums & Vaccins becomes a wholly owned subsidiary of Rhône-Poulenc.
- 1996: Pasteur Mérieux Connaught is the new name of Pasteur Mérieux Serums et Vaccins.
- 1999: Rhône-Poulenc and Hoechst unite their Life Sciences activities in a single company, which takes on the name Aventis. Within this group, Pasteur Mérieux Connaught changes its name to Aventis Pasteur.
- 2004: merger of Aventis with and into Sanofi. The new Sanofi-Aventis Group becomes the world's 3rd largest pharmaceutical company, behind Pfizer and GlaxoSmithKline. Aventis Pasteur, the vaccine division of the Sanofi-Aventis Group, changes its name to Sanofi Pasteur.
- 2008: Sanofi Pasteur acquires Acambis plc, a biotech company.
- 2009: Sanofi Pasteur acquires major stake in Hyderabad-based Shantha Biotechnics.
- 2020: Sanofi Pasteur and GlaxoSmithKline have said they are starting clinical trials of their coronavirus vaccine. They hope to have the first results of the trial by December and if it is successful they will move on to further trials by the end of the year.

== Key facts & figures in 2012 ==
Sanofi Pasteur

- 2012 net sales: €3,897 million (+5.7% over 2011)
- Staff: nearly 13,000 employees worldwide
- More than 1 billion doses of vaccines produced yearly to immunize more than 500 million people in the world
- Largest product range available, against 20 infectious diseases
- More than €1 million invested every day in R&D
- Nearly €2 billion invested in the last 5 years in production infrastructures.
- Headquarters: Lyon, France
- 14 production and/or R&D sites located in:
  - Marcy-l'Étoile and Val-de-Reuil, France
  - Swiftwater, Pennsylvania (Sanofi Pasteur's United States headquarters), Cambridge, Massachusetts and Canton, Massachusetts, Orlando, Florida and Rockville, Maryland, United States
  - Toronto, Ontario, Canada
  - Pilar, Buenos Aires Province, Argentina
  - Shenzhen, China
  - Hyderabad, India
  - Ocoyoacac, Mexico
  - Chachoengsao, Thailand
  - Neuville-sur-Saône, France

== Vaccines ==
This list is for vaccines with trade names; Sanofi Pasteur also produces many generic vaccines which do not have trade names

- Cancer vaccines
  - bladder cancer: TheraCys
- Coronavirus vaccines
  - A COVID-19 vaccine is under development by the French pharmaceutical company and the British pharmaceutical company GlaxoSmithKline. Advanced clinical trials of the vaccine were delayed in December 2020 after it failed to produce a strong immune response in people over the age of 50, most likely due to an insufficient antigen concentration in the vaccine, delaying the launch of the vaccine to late 2021.
- Dengue vaccines
  - Dengvaxia, approved in 18 countries
- DPT vaccines
  - Adacel
  - Daptacel
  - Tripedia (Trepedia), discontinued, last shipped in 2012
- Haemophilus influenzae type b vaccines
  - ActHIB
- Hepatitis A vaccines
  - Avaxim 160 U (or just Avaxim)
- Hepatitis B vaccines
  - Genhevac B Pasteur
  - Hbvaxpro (5, 10 and 40 μg)
- Influenza vaccines
  - Addigrip
  - Flublok Quadrivalent
  - Fluzone High-Dose
  - Fluzone (standard-dose; without preservatives; pediatric dose without preservatives)
  - Sandovac
  - Vaxigrip
- Japanese encephalitis virus vaccines
  - JE-VAX (inactivated)
  - IMOJEV (live, attenuated)
- Measles vaccines
  - Rouvax
- Meningococcal vaccines
  - Menactra, the first meningococcal vaccine approved for use in infants
  - Menomune-A/C/Y/W-135
  - Vaccin Meningococcique A+C
- MMR vaccines
  - M-M-RVaxPro
- Pneumonia vaccines
  - Pneumo 23
- Polio vaccines
  - Imovax Polio
  - Ipol
  - Polio Salk
- Rabies vaccines
  - Imovax Rabies (Imovax)
  - Imogam Rabies-HT, rabies immune globulin
  - Vaccin Rabique Pasteur
  - Verorab
- Rubella vaccines
  - Rudivax
- Smallpox vaccines
  - ACAM 2000
- Tetanus vaccines
  - Vaccin Tetanique Pasteur
- Tuberculosis vaccines
  - Mycobax
  - Tubersol
  - Vaccin Bcg Ssi
- Typhoid fever vaccines
  - Typhim Vi
- Yellow fever vaccines
  - Stamaril
  - YF-VAX
- Diphtheria and tetanus combined vaccines
  - DECAVAC
  - dT reduct
  - D. T. Vax
- Diphtheria, tetanus and polio combined vaccines
  - Revaxis
- DPT, haemophilus combined vaccines
  - TriHIBit, a booster vaccine, with DPT and haemophilus influenzae type b vaccines
- DPT, polio combined vaccines
  - Repevax
- DPT, haemophilus, polio combined vaccines
  - Pentacel
  - Pentavac
- DPT, haemophilus, polio, hepatitis B combined vaccines
  - Hexavac
- Hepatitis A, typhoid fever combined vaccines
  - Tyavax
