= DTaP-IPV-HepB vaccine =

Combination vaccine

Combination of
- DTaP vaccine: Vaccine
- Inactivated poliovirus vaccine: Vaccine
- Hepatitis B vaccine: Vaccine

Clinical data
- Trade names: Pediarix
- AHFS/Drugs.com: Pediarix
- MedlinePlus: a607014
- License data: US DailyMed: Pediarix
- Routes of administration: Intramuscular
- ATC code: J07CA12 (WHO)

Legal status
- Legal status: US: ℞-only

DTaP-IPV-HepB vaccine is a combination vaccine whose generic name is diphtheria and tetanus toxoids and acellular pertussis adsorbed, hepatitis B (recombinant) and inactivated polio vaccine or DTaP-IPV-Hep B. It protects against the infectious diseases diphtheria, tetanus, pertussis, poliomyelitis, and hepatitis B.

A branded formulation is marketed in the U.S. as Pediarix by GlaxoSmithKline.

== DTaP ==
The DTaP portion of the vaccine protects against three bacterial infections: diphtheria, tetanus, and pertussis (whooping cough). Diphtheria is a bacterium that causes problems with breathing, heart failure, paralysis, and in some cases death. It is spread via human to human interaction. Tetanus is spread via open cuts or wounds in the body. It can lead to stiffening of the muscles, which can result in difficulties breathing. Pertussis, also known as whooping cough, is the is "aP" portion of the DTaP vaccine. Like diphtheria, it is spread via human to human interaction. With the vaccine, children can build up a supply of antibodies that prevent infection. In general, the DTaP vaccine is only administered to children ages 7 and younger.

== IPV ==
The IPV portion of the DTaP-IPV-HepB vaccine protects against poliomyelitis, otherwise known as polio. IPV stands for inactivated poliovirus vaccine, which means that it does not use a live strand of the polio virus and cannot result in polio. Polio is a life-threatening disease that can cause paralysis, poor muscle function that weakens the ability to breathe, and brain problems. Since 2016, the United States requires all polio vaccines administered to be IPV and not OPV to eliminate the use of live polio virus.

== HepB ==
The HepB portion of the vaccine protects against hepatitis B. Hepatitis B is a virus that can be spread via mother to child if the mother is infected with hepatitis B, so most doctors recommend that infants be vaccinated. In most individuals infected with hepatitis B, they are asymptomatic. However, symptoms of hepatitis B include flu-like symptoms, diarrhea, and jaundice. Hepatitis B can either be acute or chronic and can ultimately lead to damage of the liver.

== Uses ==
The main reason for the use of combination vaccines is because they require fewer shots. Instead of having a child receive separate shots for each virus they need protection from, scientists were able to create vaccines, like MMR and DTap-IPV-HepB, that protect against several viruses at a time. Another reason is that with the IPV (inactivated poliovirus vaccine) portion of the DTap-IPV-HeB vaccine, children no longer have to take the oral vaccine (OPV) that was administered starting in the 1950s. Although the oral vaccine helped eliminate polio in several countries and is still used in countries today, OPV contains live polio virus and can still result in individuals getting polio. Combination vaccines are also more cost effective and make it more likely for children to receive vaccinations. With the DTaP vaccine on its own, it is to be administered in five doses. However, when the DTaP vaccine is administered through the DTaP-IPV-HepB combination vaccine like Pediarix, it only has to be administered in three doses.

== Formulations ==
In general, the DTaP-IPV-HepB vaccine is recommended to be administered in three doses around 8, 12, and 16 weeks old. Talk to your doctor about the vaccine schedule that is best for your child. There are several common DTaP combinations vaccines: Pediarix, Kinrix, and Pentacel. Pediarix combines DTap-IPV-Hep B and Pentacel combines DTaP-IPV-Hib (Haemophilus influenza type b); however, Kinrix only combines DTaP-IPV, which leaves out Hep B and Hib. Therefore, Pediarix and Pentacel are more commonly used because they protect from five rather than four viruses in each dose. For protecting against DTaP viruses, polio, and hepatitis B, Pediarix is the recommended formulation.

=== Pediarix ===
Pediarix is vaccine that is protective against diphtheria, tetanus, pertussis, hepatitis B, and polio. This vaccine is FDA approved to be administered to infants in three doses between ages six weeks and six years. Pediarix should not be injected into any child seven years old or older. However, it is recommended that the immunizations be done at months two, four, and six. The wide age gap between six weeks and six years allows for children who fall behind in their vaccinations to still have the opportunity to be vaccinated. From the moment of birth, babies can become infected with these life-threatening diseases, which is why this vaccine is recommended to be given so early on. With these three doses, the Pediarix vaccine has been given to over 8,088 infants. Each does is 0.5mL and is given via intramuscular. For children ages one and younger, the vaccine is injected into the thigh. While for children older than one, it is injected into the deltoid muscle of the arm. Because the Pediarix vaccine has HepB, is it important to note the mother's HBsAg status. Pediarix is recommended for mothers who are HBsAg-negative; however, in 2003 it was approved that children whose mothers are HBsAg-positive can also receive the Pediarix immunization. Looking at overall completed vaccine records, Pediarix completes the amount of HepB doses that an individual needs to be protected. However, boosters are still needed for DTaP and IPV vaccines after the three doses of Pediarix.

== DTaP-IPV-HepB virus activity ==
As of 2021, there were 1,609 cases of pertussis in the United States. The majority of cases were found amongst 6-11 month old children.
