= Pentavalent vaccine =

A pentavalent vaccine (or Penta vaccine) combines five vaccines into one dose. Some pentavalent vaccines are:

- DTwP-HepB-Hib vaccine, which protects against diphtheria, tetanus, whooping cough, hepatitis B and Haemophilus influenzae type B and is generally used in middle- and low-income countries.
- DTaP-IPV/Hib vaccine, used in the UK until 2017 (replaced by a hexavalent vaccine).
- DTaP-IPV-HepB vaccine, approved in the US.

Penta3 coverage is the number, or percentage, receiving the third dose.
