= Zero-dose child =

Term for an infant who has not received any routine immunizations

- Field: Public health, Global health, Immunization
- Origin: World Health Organization / UNICEF monitoring under Immunization Agenda 2030
- Purpose: Equity indicator identifying infants not reached by routine immunization services

A zero-dose child is a term in global public health for an infant who has not received any routine childhood vaccine doses. For operational monitoring, the WHO and UNICEF measure zero-dose status as the non-receipt of the first dose of a DTP-containing vaccine (DTP1) by the end of the first year of life. The number of zero-dose children is a core equity indicator of the Immunization Agenda 2030 (IA2030).

== Definition and measurement ==
WHO and UNICEF track zero-dose children using the DTP1 proxy: those who did not receive a first dose of a DTP-containing vaccine –against diphtheria, pertussis (whooping cough), and tetanus (lockjaw)– by age one are counted as zero-dose. Research sometimes uses broader definitions to identify children who truly received no vaccines at all (e.g., among children aged 12–23 months, having received none of BCG, polio, pentavalent/DTP-containing or measles-containing vaccines).

== Global burden and trends ==
According to WHO/UNICEF's 2024 coverage estimates released in 2025, about 14.3 million infants worldwide were zero-dose—meaning they received no routine vaccines in their first year of life—despite modest stabilization in overall coverage compared with 2023. Zero-dose children are disproportionately found in settings affected by fragility, conflict or humanitarian crises. Barriers include limited access to primary health care, supply interruptions, displacement and misinformation.

== Policy and programmes ==
Reducing the number of zero-dose children is a central equity goal of IA2030 (target: a 50% reduction from the 2019 baseline by 2030). Gavi prioritises "zero-dose children and missed communities," defining zero-dose programmatically as infants without DTP1 by age one and setting interim and long-term reduction targets. Evidence syntheses emphasise that reaching zero-dose children is pivotal for achieving broader immunization and health goals and that strategies must address both access and demand barriers, often focusing on urban poor, remote rural and conflict-affected settings.

=== Individual action ===
In addition to government and partner programmes, individual donors sometimes support efforts to increase routine immunization. Charity evaluators such as GiveWell have identified New Incentives' conditional cash transfer programme in northern Nigeria as a highly cost-effective opportunity for individuals seeking to increase vaccination uptake, based on evidence from an independent randomized evaluation and ongoing monitoring. Reviews of incentive programmes note that conditional cash transfers can increase routine immunization coverage in low- and middle-income countries, though effects vary by context.

== See also ==
- Vaccine hesitancy
- Global health
