= Fourgeaud =

Fourgeaud is a surname. Notable people with the surname include:

- Julien Fourgeaud (1980–2014), French entrepreneur, ex-Rovio's digital services product strategist and co-founder of Scarlet Motors
- Victor Fourgeaud (1815–1875), American doctor and legislator
