= Diphtheria vaccine =

Vaccine against diphtheria

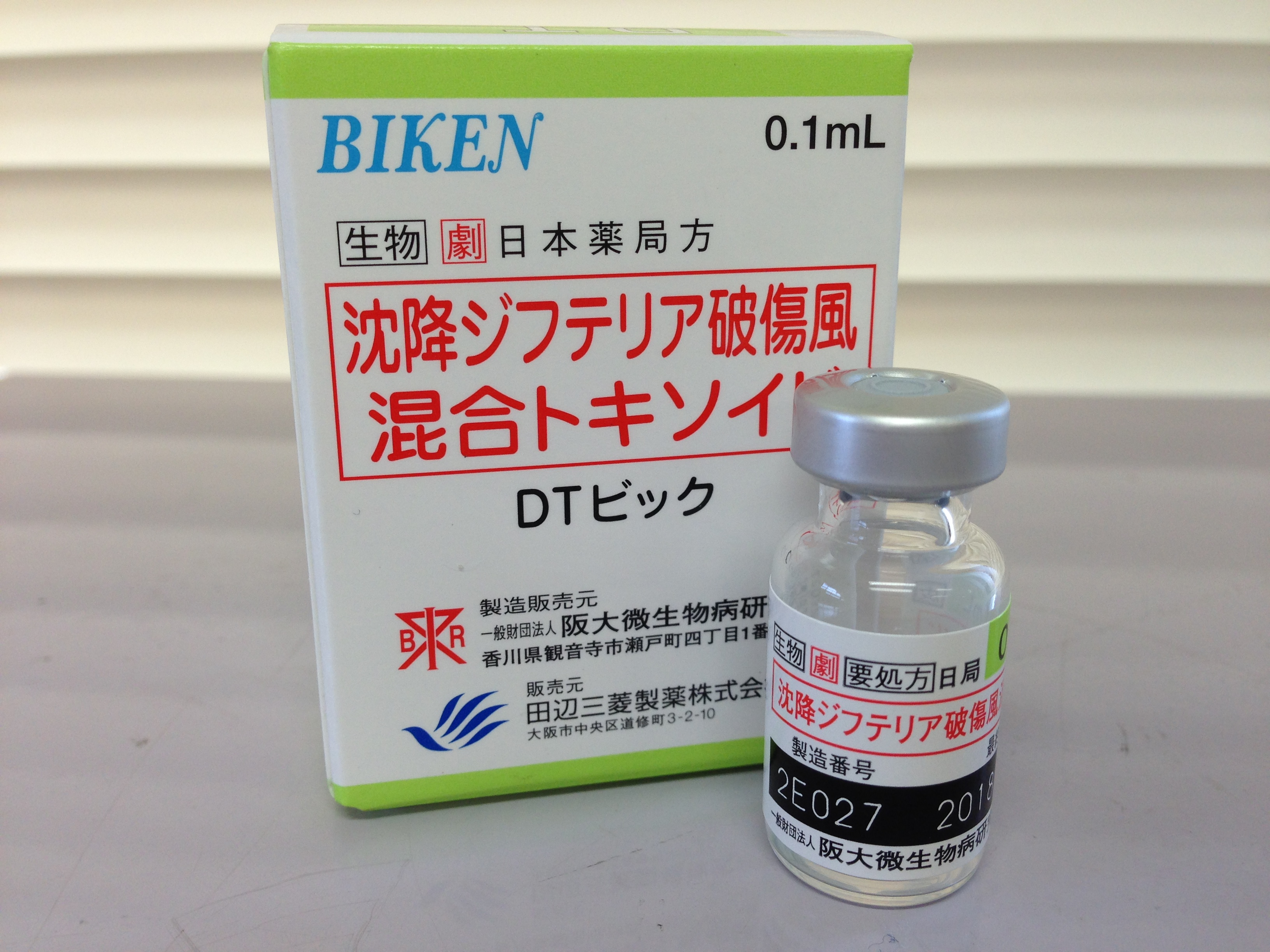
- DT vaccine in Japan

Vaccine description
- Target: Corynebacterium diphtheriae
- Vaccine type: Toxoid

Clinical data
- MedlinePlus: a607027
- Routes of administration: Intramuscular injection
- ATC code: J07AF01 (WHO)

Legal status
- Legal status: US: ℞-only; EU: Rx-only

Identifiers
- ChemSpider: none

Diphtheria vaccine is a toxoid vaccine against diphtheria, an illness caused by Corynebacterium diphtheriae. Its use resulted in a more than 90% decrease in the number of cases globally between 1980 and 2000. The first dose is recommended at six weeks of age with two additional doses four weeks apart, after which it is about 95% effective during childhood. Three further doses are recommended during childhood. It is unclear if further doses later in life are needed.

The diphtheria vaccine is very safe. Significant side effects are rare. Pain may occur at the injection site. A bump may form at the site of injection that lasts a few weeks. The vaccine is safe in both pregnancy and among those who have a poor immune function.

The diphtheria vaccine is delivered in several combinations. Some combinations (Td and DT vaccines) include tetanus vaccine, others (known as DPT vaccine or DTaP vaccine depending on the pertussis antigen used) comes with the tetanus and pertussis vaccines, and still others include additional vaccines such as Hib vaccine, hepatitis B vaccine, or inactivated polio vaccine. The World Health Organization (WHO) has recommended its use since 1974. About 84% of the world population is vaccinated. It is given as an intramuscular injection.

The diphtheria vaccine was developed in 1923. It is on the World Health Organization's List of Essential Medicines.

== History ==
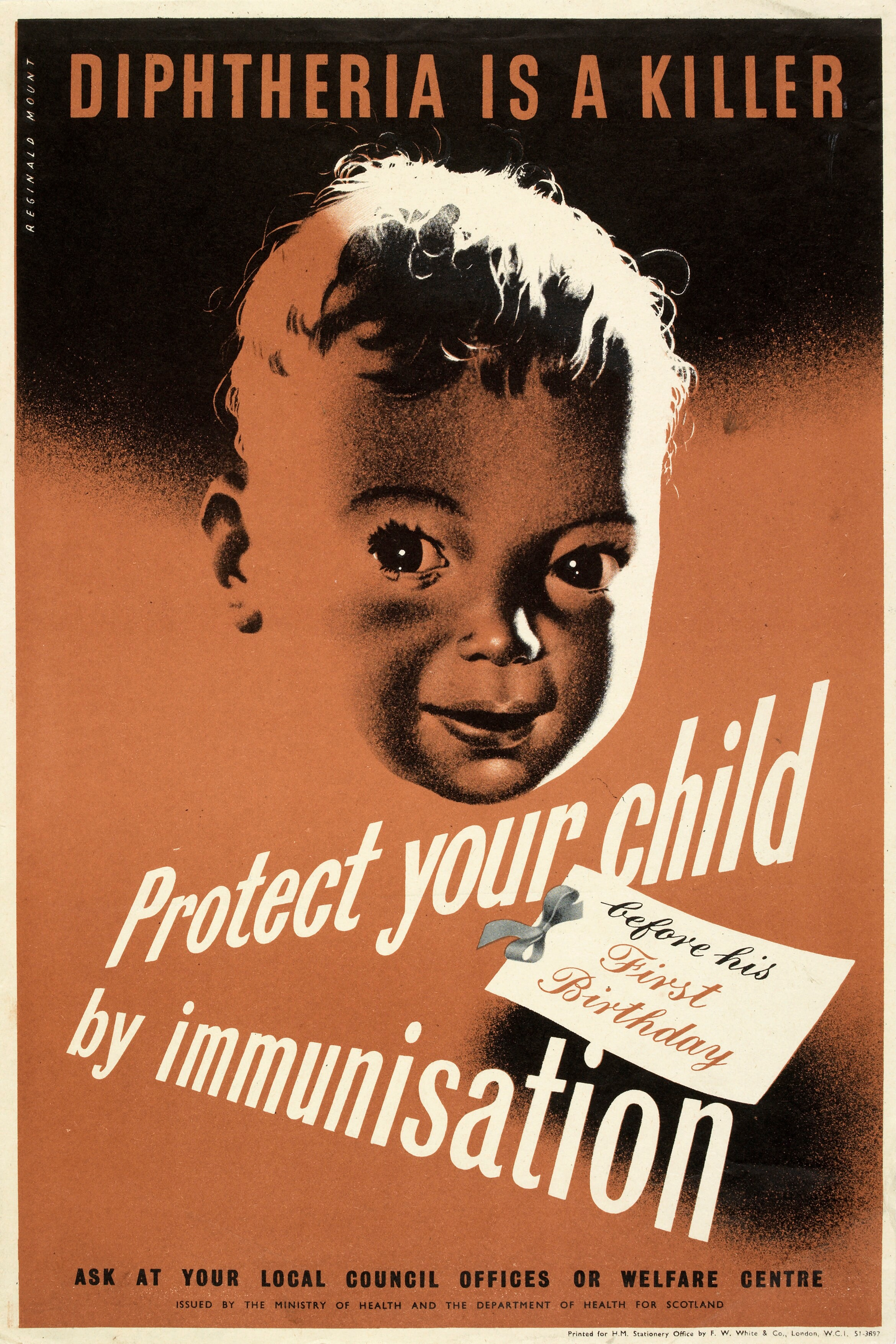
Diphtheria prevention poster from the UK (around 1939-1945).

In 1890, Kitasato Shibasaburō and Emil von Behring at the University of Berlin reported the development of 'antitoxins' against diphtheria and tetanus. Their method involved injecting the respective toxins into animals and then purifying antibodies from their blood. Behring called this method 'serum therapy'. While effective against the pathogen, initial tests on humans were unsuccessful. By 1894, the production of antibodies had been optimised with help from Paul Ehrlich, and the treatment started to show success in humans. The serum therapy reduced mortality to 1–5%, although there were also reports of severe adverse reactions, including at least one death. Behring won the very first Nobel Prize in Physiology or Medicine for this discovery in 1901. Kitasato, however, was not awarded.

By 1913, Behring had created Antitoxin-Toxin (antibody-antigen) complexes to produce the diphtheria AT vaccine. In 1923, Gaston Ramon developed a cheaper version by using formaldehyde-inactivated toxins. As the use of these vaccines spread across the world, the number of diphtheria cases was greatly reduced. In the United States alone, the number of cases fell from 100,000 to 200,000 per year in the 1920s to 19,000 in 1945 and 14 in the period 1996–2018.

== Effectiveness ==
About 95% of people vaccinated develop immunity, and vaccination against diphtheria has resulted in a more than 90% decrease in number of cases globally between 1980 and 2000. About 86% of the world population was vaccinated as of 2016.

== Side effects ==
Severe side effects from diphtheria toxoid are rare. Pain may occur at the injection site. A bump may form at the site of injection that lasts a few weeks. The vaccine is safe during pregnancy and among those who have a poor immune function. DTP vaccines may cause additional adverse effects such as fever, irritability, drowsiness, loss of appetite, and, in 6–13% of vaccine recipients, vomiting. Severe adverse effects of DTP vaccines include fever over 40.5 °C/104.9 °F (1 in 333 doses), febrile seizures (1 in 12,500 doses), and hypotonic-hyporesponsive episodes (1 in 1,750 doses). Side effects of DTaP vaccines are similar but less frequent. Tetanus toxoid containing vaccines (Td, DT, DTP and DTaP) may cause brachial neuritis at a rate of 0.5 to 1 case per 100,000 toxoid recipients.

== Recommendations ==
The World Health Organization has recommended vaccination against diphtheria since 1974. The first dose is recommended at six weeks of age with two additional doses four weeks apart, after receiving these three doses about 95% of people are immune. Three further doses are recommended during childhood. Booster doses every ten years are no longer recommended if this vaccination scheme of 3 doses + 3 booster doses is followed. Injection of 3 doses + 1 booster dose, provides immunity for 25 years after the last dose. If only three initial doses are given, booster doses are needed to ensure continuing protection.

== See also ==
- Bundaberg tragedy
- DTP-HepB vaccine
