= DTaP-IPV vaccine =

Vaccine against diphtheria, tetanus, whooping cough and polio

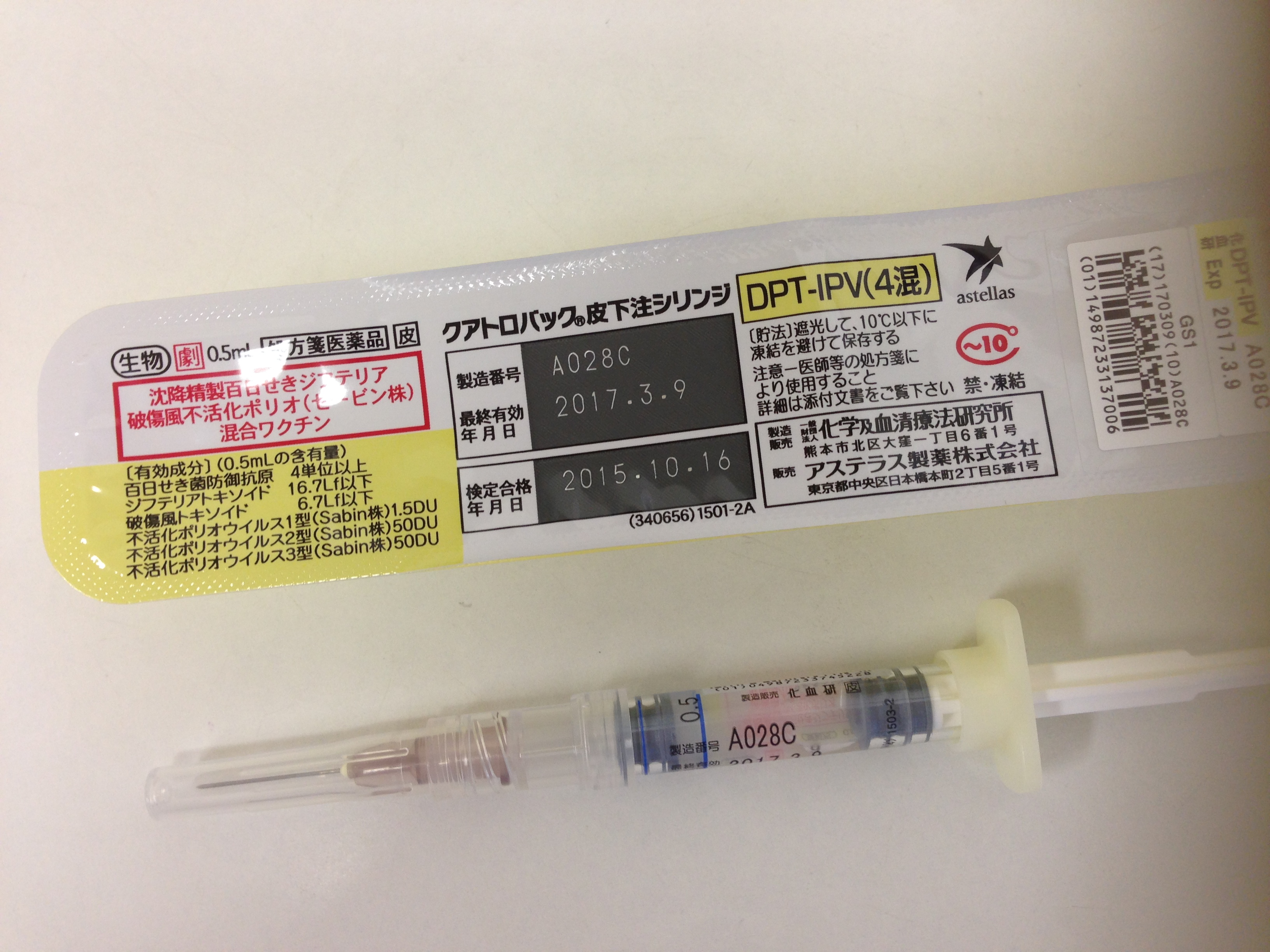
- DPT-IPV vaccine in Japan

Combination of
- DTaP vaccine: Vaccine
- Inactivated poliovirus vaccine: Vaccine

Clinical data
- Trade names: Kinrix, Quadracel, Boostrix-IPV, Infanrix-IPV, others
- Other names: diphtheria, tetanus, pertussis (acellular, component) and poliomyelitis (inactivated) vaccine (adsorbed, reduced antigen(s) content)
- AHFS/Drugs.com: Kinrix Quadracel
- Pregnancy category: AU: A
- Routes of administration: Intramuscular injection
- ATC code: J07CA02 (WHO)

Legal status
- Legal status: In general: ℞ (Prescription only)

Identifiers
- CAS Number: 1688606-07-6

DTaP-IPV vaccine is a combination vaccine whose full generic name is diphtheria and tetanus toxoids and acellular pertussis adsorbed and inactivated poliovirus vaccine (IPV).

It is also known as DTaP/IPV, dTaP/IPV, DTPa-IPV, or DPT-IPV. It protects against the infectious diseases diphtheria, tetanus, pertussis, and poliomyelitis.

Branded formulations marketed in the USA are Kinrix from GlaxoSmithKline and Quadracel from Sanofi Pasteur.

Repevax is available in the UK.

In Japan, the formulation is called 四種混合(shishukongou - "mixture of 4"). Astellas markets it under the クアトロバック ('Quattro-back') formulation, while another is available from Mitsubishi Tanabe Pharma named テトラビック ('Tetrabic'). A previous product by Takeda Pharmaceutical Company has been withdrawn by the company.
