= Neonatal tetanus =

Neonatal Tetanus
- Other names: Maternal neonatal tetanus (MNT)
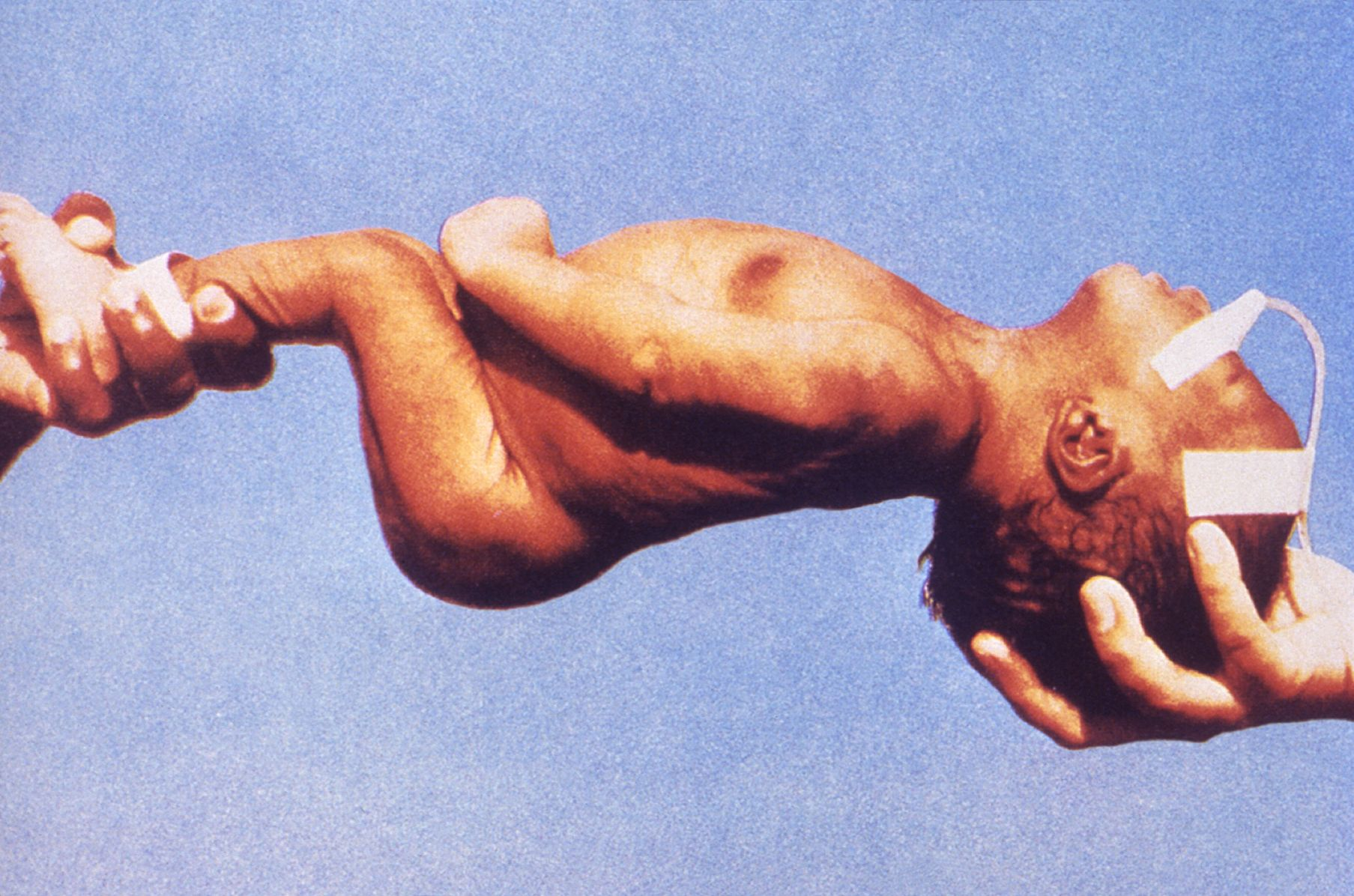
- Neonatal tetanus
- Specialty: Pediatrics, Infectious disease

Neonatal tetanus (trismus nascentium) is a form of generalised tetanus that occurs in newborns. Infants who have not acquired passive immunity from an immunized mother are at risk. It usually occurs through infection of the unhealed umbilical stump, particularly when the stump is cut with a non-sterile instrument. Neonatal tetanus mostly occurs in developing countries, particularly those with the least developed health infrastructure. It is rare in developed countries.

The WHO recommend that unimmunized pregnant women receive tetanus toxoid in the pregnancy to prevent the disease in their baby once born.

Globally, deaths from neonatal tetanus was 787,000 in the early 1980s. In 1989, the WHO launched a programme to vaccinate all pregnant women, and deaths from neonatal tetanus dropped to 25,000 in 2018.

== Signs and symptoms ==
In neonatal tetanus, symptoms usually appear from 4 to 14 days after birth, averaging about 7 days. The fatality rate for infants has been estimated as 70% to 100%; death usually occurs by the age of 2 weeks. On the basis of clinical findings, four different forms of tetanus have been described. The time from exposure to symptoms may be up to several months. The neonate is unable to suck and cry, is rigid, and develops spasms.

== Prevention ==
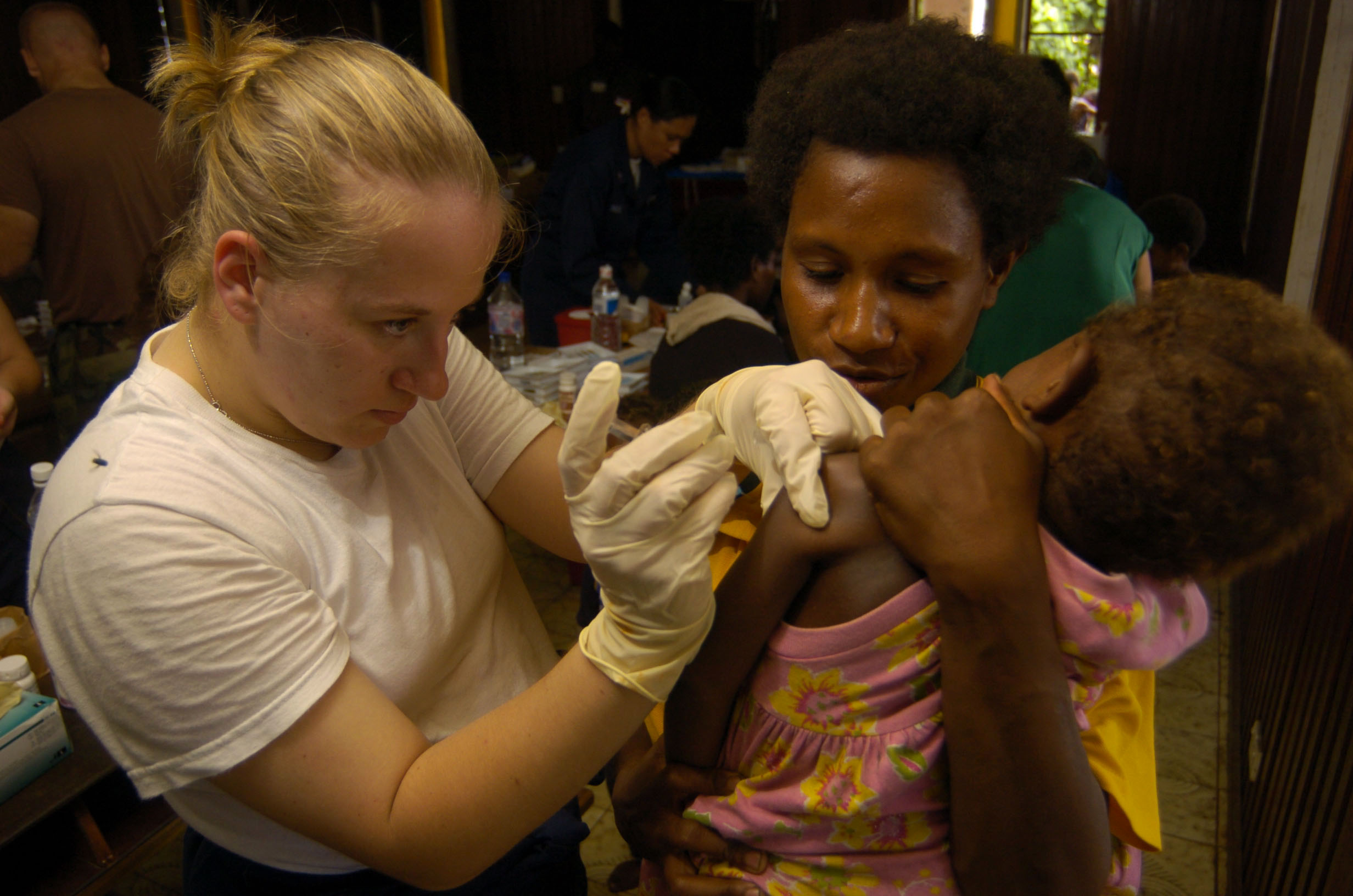
A tetanus shot is administered to a child and her mother

The spores which cause tetanus are present everywhere, so the only prevention is immunization. Three properly spaced doses of tetanus toxoid vaccine are recommended for women of childbearing age, either before or during pregnancy; this will protect their future babies from neonatal tetanus after delivery.

=== Public health campaigns ===
In 1989, the World Health Congress called for the elimination of neonatal tetanus. UNICEF took the lead, assisted by other United Nations agencies, individual governments, and non-profit organisations. By 2000, the disease was declared as eliminated from 104 of 161 developing countries. "Elimination" is defined as less than 1 case per 1,000 live births in every district of the country. Since tetanus can also strike postpartum mothers, the campaign has been expanded to target both maternal and neonatal tetanus.

In many affected countries, there was a lack of awareness of maternal and neonatal tetanus and how to prevent it. Education and immunisation campaigns have been launched in the remaining countries at risk and are targeted particularly at pregnant women. Education focuses on hygienic birth practices and infant cord care as well as the need for immunisation.

In Egypt, the number of cases of neonatal tetanus dropped from 4,000 to fewer than 500 annually as the result of an immunisation campaign. In Morocco, neonatal tetanus accounted for 20% of neonatal deaths in 1987 but only 2% in 1992. In 1998 in Uganda, 3,433 tetanus cases were recorded in newborn babies; of these, 2,403 died. After a major public health effort, Uganda in 2011 was certified as having eliminated tetanus. In 2011, Pampers joined with UNICEF to target maternal and neonatal tetanus in Yemen. In 2010, Kiwanis International pledged to raise $110 million to eliminate maternal and neonatal tetanus throughout the world in partnership with UNICEF.

On 15 May 2015, the World Health Organization (WHO) declared India free from maternal and neonatal tetanus. India has reduced its infant mortality rate (IMR) from 380 per 1000 live births in 1990, to 40 in 2015, and its maternal mortality rate (MMR) from 540 per 100,000 to 167 in the same years. The national health programme was started in 1983 by the Government of India, when all pregnant women were given two doses of tetanus vaccine. The number of deaths from tetanus dropped from 79,000 in 1990, to less than 500 in 2013 and 2014.

== Epidemiology ==
New neonatal tetanus cases per million

In 2000, neonatal tetanus was responsible for about 14% (215,000) of all neonatal deaths. In 2008, 59,000 newborns worldwide died as a result of neonatal tetanus. In 2005, 57 countries were identified as still at risk, with 27 countries accounting for 90% of cases. As of December 2013 the number of countries at risk was reduced to 25.
