= DTaP-IPV/Hib vaccine =

Combination vaccine

Combination of
- DTaP vaccine: Vaccine
- Inactivated poliovirus vaccine: Vaccine
- Hib vaccine: Vaccine

Clinical data
- Trade names: Pentacel, Pediacel, Infanrix IPV + Hib, others
- AHFS/Drugs.com: FDA Professional Drug Information
- Routes of administration: Intramuscular injection
- ATC code: J07CA06 (WHO)

Legal status
- Legal status: UK: POM (Prescription only); US: ℞-only

Identifiers
- CAS Number: 1688606-53-2

DTaP-IPV/Hib vaccine is a 5-in-1 combination vaccine that protects against diphtheria, tetanus, whooping cough, polio, and Haemophilus influenzae type B.

Its generic name is "diphtheria and tetanus toxoids and acellular pertussis adsorbed, inactivated poliovirus and haemophilus B conjugate vaccine", and it is also known as DTaP-IPV-Hib.

== Uses ==
DTaP-IPV/Hib vaccine is administered to young children to immunise against diphtheria, tetanus, pertussis, poliomyelitis, and diseases caused by Haemophilus influenzae type B.

== Formulations ==
A branded formulation marketed in the United States is Pentacel, manufactured by Sanofi Pasteur.

Pentacel is known in the UK and Canada as Pediacel. In April 2024, Sanofi discontinued Pediacel in Canada, transitioning to Pentacel.

An equivalent vaccine marketed in the UK and Canada by GlaxoSmithKline is Infanrix IPV + Hib. This is a two-part vaccine. The DTaP-IPV component is supplied as a sterile liquid, which is used to reconstitute lyophilized (freeze-dried) Hib vaccine.

Pentaxim is a liquid formulation marketed by Sanofi Pasteur.

== Availability ==
It is only licensed for young children. The United States Food and Drug Administration has approved the vaccine for children from age 6 weeks up to age 5 years. It was used in the UK until 2017, following which a 6-in-1 vaccine became available containing the additional protection against Hepatitis B.
