= DPT vaccine =

Combination vaccine

- Global vaccination coverage- diphtheria-tetanus-pertussis (DTP3) immunization

Combination of
- Diphtheria vaccine: Vaccine
- Pertussis vaccine: Vaccine
- Tetanus vaccine: Vaccine

Clinical data
- Trade names: Adacel, Boostrix, others
- AHFS/Drugs.com: Monograph
- MedlinePlus: a607027
- License data: US DailyMed: Diphtheria and tetanus
- Routes of administration: Intramuscular injection
- ATC code: None

Legal status
- Legal status: AU: S4 (Prescription only); CA: ℞-only / Schedule D; US: ℞-only with standing order; EU: Rx-only; In general: ℞ (Prescription only)

Identifiers
- CAS Number: 863488-19-1
- ChemSpider: none
- KEGG: D05356

The DPT vaccine or DTP vaccine is a class of combination vaccines to protect against three infectious diseases in humans: diphtheria, pertussis (whooping cough), and tetanus (lockjaw). The vaccine components include diphtheria and tetanus toxoids, and either killed whole cells of the bacterium that causes pertussis or pertussis antigens. The term toxoid refers to vaccines which use an inactivated toxin produced by the pathogen which they are targeted against to generate an immune response. In this way, the toxoid vaccine generates an immune response which is targeted against the toxin which is produced by the pathogen and causes disease, rather than a vaccine which is targeted against the pathogen itself. The whole cells or antigens will be depicted as either "DTwP" or "DTaP", where the lower-case "w" indicates whole-cell inactivated pertussis and the lower-case "a" stands for "acellular". In comparison to alternative vaccine types, such as live attenuated vaccines, the DTP vaccine does not contain any live pathogen, but rather uses inactivated toxoid (and for pertussis, either a dead pathogen or pure antigens) to generate an immune response; therefore, there is not a risk of use in populations that are immune compromised since there is not any known risk of causing the disease itself. As a result, the DTP vaccine is considered a safe vaccine to use in anyone and it generates a much more targeted immune response specific for the pathogen of interest.

In the United States, the DPT (whole-cell) vaccine was administered as part of the childhood vaccines recommended by the Centers for Disease Control and Prevention (CDC) until 1996, when the acellular DTaP vaccine was licensed for use.

== History ==
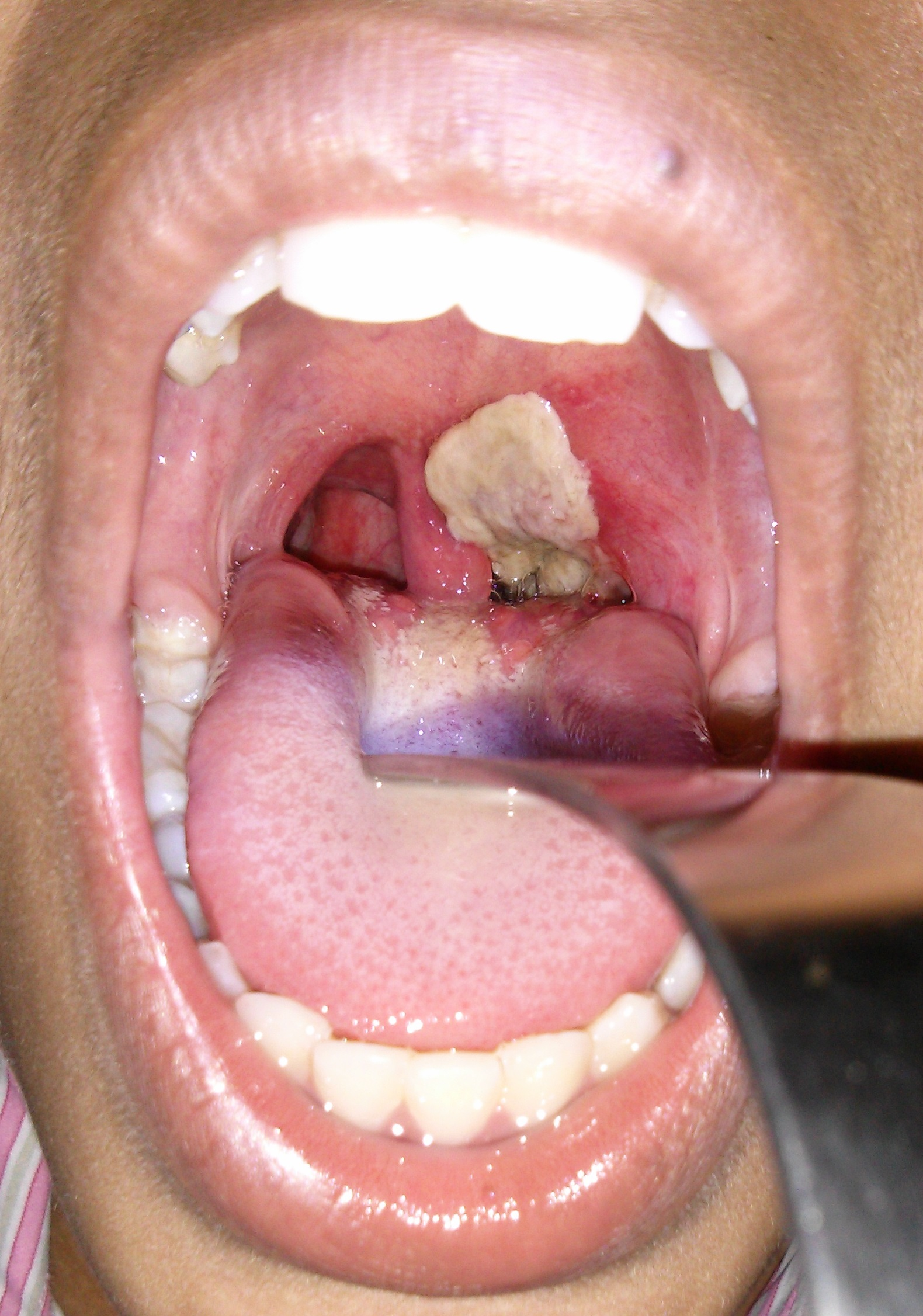
An adherent, dense, grey pseudomembrane covering the tonsils is classically seen in diphtheria

Diphtheria and tetanus toxoids and whole-cell pertussis (DTP; now also "DTwP" to differentiate from the broader class of triple-combination vaccines) vaccination was licensed in 1949. Since the introduction of the combination vaccine, there has been an extensive decline in the incidence of pertussis, or whooping cough, the disease which the vaccine protects against. Additionally, the rates of disease have continued to decline as more extensive immunization strategies have been implemented, including booster doses and increased emphasis on increasing health literacy.

In the 20th century, the advancements in vaccinations helped to reduce the incidence of childhood pertussis and had a dramatically positive effect on the health of populations in the United States. However, in the early 21st century, reported instances of the disease increased 20-fold due to a downturn in the number of immunizations received and resulted in numerous fatalities. During the 21st century, many parents declined to vaccinate their children against pertussis for fear of perceived side effects, despite scientific evidence showing vaccines to be highly effective and safe. A study published in 2009 concluded the largest risk among unvaccinated children is not the contraction of side effects, but rather the disease that the vaccination aims to protect against.

DTP vaccines with acellular pertussis (DTaP; see below) were introduced in the 1990s. The reduced range of antigens causes fewer side effects, but results in a more expensive, shorter-lasting, and possibly less protective vaccine compared to DTwP. High-income countries have mostly switched to DTaP. As of 2023, global production of aP remains limited.

=== Vaccination rates ===
In 2016, the US Centers for Disease Control and Prevention (CDC) reported that 80.4% of children in the US had received four or more DTaP vaccinations by 2 years of life. Vaccination rates for children aged 13–17 with one or more TDaP shots was 90.2% in 2019. Only 43.6% of adults (older than 18 years of age) have received a TDaP shot in the last 10 years. The CDC aimed to increase vaccination rate among 2-year-olds from 80.4% to 90.0%

The World Health Organization (WHO) estimated that 89% of people globally had received at least one dose of DTP vaccine and 84% had received three doses of the vaccine, completing the WHO-recommended primary series (DTP3). The WHO tracks DTP3 completion rates among one-year-olds on a yearly basis. The yearly DTP3 completion rate is considered a good proxy for the completeness of childhood vaccination in general, and numbers of children who have not received a first dose of DTP are used as a proxy for those who are not reached by vaccination programs at all (termed zero-dose children).

== Combination vaccines with acellular pertussis ==
DTaP and Tdap are both combination vaccines against diphtheria, tetanus, and pertussis. The "a" indicates that the pertussis toxoids are acellular, while the lower-case "d" and "p" in "Tdap" indicate smaller concentrations of diphtheria toxoids and pertussis antigens.

=== DTaP ===
DTaP (also DTP and TDaP) is a combination vaccine against diphtheria, tetanus, and pertussis, in which the pertussis component is acellular. This is in contrast to whole-cell, inactivated DTP (or DTwP). The acellular vaccine uses selected antigens of the pertussis pathogen to induce immunity. Because it uses fewer antigens than the whole-cell vaccines, it is considered to cause fewer side effects, but it is also more expensive. Research suggests that the DTwP vaccine is more effective than DTaP in conferring immunity, because DTaP's narrower antigen base is less effective against current pathogen strains.

=== Tdap ===
Tdap (also TDP) is a tetanus toxoid, reduced diphtheria toxoid, and acellular pertussis vaccine. It was licensed in the United States for use in adults and adolescents in June 2005. Two Tdap vaccines are available in the US. In January 2011, the Advisory Committee on Immunization Practices (ACIP) of the US Centers for Disease Control and Prevention (CDC) recommended the use of Tdap in adults of all ages, including those aged 65 years of age and older. In October 2011, in an effort to reduce the burden of pertussis in infants, the ACIP recommended that unvaccinated pregnant women receive a dose of Tdap. In October 2012, the ACIP voted to recommend the use of Tdap during every pregnancy. The ACIP and Canada's National Advisory Committee on Immunization (NACI) recommended that both adolescents and adults receive Tdap in place of their next Td booster (recommended to be given every ten years). Tdap and Td can be used as prophylaxis for tetanus in wound management. People who will be in contact with young infants are encouraged to get Tdap even if it has been less than five years since Td or TT to reduce the risk of infants being exposed to pertussis. NACI suggests intervals shorter than five years can be used for catch-up programs and other instances where programmatic concerns make five-year intervals difficult.

The World Health Organization recommends a pentavalent vaccine, combining the DTP vaccine with vaccines against Haemophilus influenzae type B and hepatitis B. Evidence on how effective this pentavalent vaccine is compared to the individual vaccines has not yet been determined.

A 2019 study found that state requirements mandating the use of the Tdap vaccine "increased Tdap vaccine take-up and reduced pertussis (whooping cough) incidence by about 32%."

== Related combination vaccines ==
=== Excluding pertussis ===
DT and Td vaccines lack the pertussis component. The Td vaccine is administered to children over the age of seven as well as to adults. It is most commonly administered as a booster shot every 10 years. The Td booster shot may also be administered as protection from a severe burn or dirty wound. The DT vaccine is given to children under the age of seven who are unable to receive the pertussis antigen in the DTaP vaccine due to a contraindication.

=== Additional targets ===
In the United States, a combined inactivated polio (IPV), DTaP, and hepatitis B DTaP-IPV-HepB vaccine is available for children. In the UK, all babies born on or after 1 August 2017 are offered a hexavalent vaccine: DTaP, IPV, Haemophilus influenzae, and hepatitis B (DTaP-Hib-HepB-IPV in short).

As of 2023, most of the DTP vaccine procured by UNICEF is of the DTwP-HepB-Hib (pentavalent whole-cell) type. The UNICEF plans to procure the DTwP-HepB-Hib-IPV (hexavalent whole-cell) vaccine starting in 2024.

== Contraindications ==
The DPT vaccine should be avoided in persons who experienced a severe allergic reaction, such as anaphylaxis, to a past vaccine containing tetanus, diphtheria, or pertussis. It should also be avoided in persons with a known severe allergy to an ingredient in the vaccine. If the reaction was caused by tetanus toxoids, the CDC recommends considering a passive immunization with tetanus immune globulin (TIG) if a person has a large or unclean wound. The DPT vaccine should also be avoided if a person developed encephalopathy (seizures, coma, declined consciousness) within seven days of receiving any pertussis-containing vaccine and the encephalopathy cannot be traced to another cause. A DT vaccine is available for children under the ages of seven who have contraindications or precautions to pertussis-containing vaccines.

== Side effects ==
=== DTaP ===
Common side effects include soreness where the shot was given, fever, irritability, tenderness, loss of appetite, and vomiting. Most side effects are mild to moderate and may last from one to three days. More serious but rare reactions after a DTaP vaccination may include seizures, lowered consciousness, or a high fever over 105 °F (41 °C). Allergic reactions are uncommon, but are medical emergencies. Signs of an allergic reaction include hives, dyspnea, wheezing, swelling of face and throat, syncope, and tachycardia and the child should be rushed to the nearest hospital.

=== Tdap ===
Common side effects include pain or swelling where the shot was given, mild fever, headache, tiredness, nausea, vomiting, diarrhea, and stomach ache. Allergic reactions are possible and have the same presentation and indications as described above for allergic reactions in DTaP. Any individual who has experienced a life-threatening allergic reaction after receiving a previous dose of diphtheria, tetanus, or pertussis containing vaccine should not receive the Tdap vaccination.

In pregnant women, research suggests that Tdap administration may be associated with an increased risk of chorioamnionitis, a placental infection. Increased incidence of fever is also noted in pregnant women. Despite the observed increase in incidence of chorioamnionitis in pregnant women following Tdap administration, there has been no observed increase in the incidence of preterm birth, for which chorioamnionitis is a risk factor. Research has not discerned an association between Tdap administration during pregnancy and other serious pregnancy complications such as neonatal death and stillbirth. An association between Tdap administration during pregnancy and pregnancy-related hypertensive disorders (such as pre-eclampsia) has not been identified.

== Immunization schedules and requirements ==
DTP third shot children unvaccinated

=== Australia ===
In Australia, the DTP vaccine is part of the National Immunisation Program (NIP). The vaccine is administered to infants in a series of doses: the first three doses are given at 2, 4, and 6 months of age, followed by a fourth dose at 18 months and a fifth dose at 4 years. Adolescents receive a single booster dose at 12–13 years.

Adults are recommended to receive a dTpa booster every 10 years, especially those in close contact with infants. Pregnant women are advised to receive a dTpa booster during each pregnancy, ideally between 20 and 32 weeks of gestation, to protect newborns from pertussis.

=== France ===
In France, children are given DTaP-Hib-HepB-IPV vaccines at 2 months (first dose) and 4 months (second dose) with a booster at 11 months of age. A tetravalent booster for diphtheria, pertussis, tetanus and poliomyelitis is given at 6 years, at 11–13 years, then at 25, 45, 65 years of age, then every 10 years.

=== Netherlands ===
In the Netherlands, pertussis is known as kinkhoest and DKTP refers to the DTaP-IPV combination vaccine against diphtheria, kinkhoest, tetanus, and polio. DTaP is given as part of the National Immunization Program.

=== United Kingdom ===
In the United Kingdom, Td/IPV is called the "3-in-1 teenage booster" and protects against tetanus, diphtheria and polio. It is given by the NHS to all teenagers aged 14 (the hexavalent vaccine is given to infants and provides the first stage of protection against diphtheria, tetanus, and polio, as well as pertussis, Haemophilus influenzae type B and hepatitis B). Subsequent boosters are recommended for foreign travellers where more than 10 years has passed since their last booster. This is provided on the NHS free of charge due to the significant risk that an imported case of polio could pose to public health in Britain.

=== United States ===
The standard immunization regimen for children within the United States is five doses of DTaP between the ages of two months and fifteen years. To be considered fully vaccinated, the Centers for Disease Control and Prevention (CDC) typically requires five doses of Tdap. The CDC recommends that children receive their first dose at two months, the second dose at four months, the third dose at six months, the fourth dose between 15 and 18 months, and the fifth dose between 4–6 years. If the fourth dose of the DTaP immunization regimen falls on or subsequent to the recipient's fourth birthday, the CDC states that only four doses are required to be fully vaccinated. In the instance that an individual under 18 has not received the DTaP vaccine, individuals should be vaccinated on the schedule in accordance with the vaccination "catch up schedule" provided by the CDC.

Infants younger than twelve months of age, specifically less than three months of age, are at highest risk of acquiring pertussis. In U.S., there is no current tetanus-diphtheria-pertussis vaccination (whooping cough) recommended or licensed for new born infants. As a result, in their first few months of life, unprotected infants are at highest risk of life-threatening complications and infections from pertussis. Infants should not receive pertussis vaccination younger than six weeks of age. Ideally, Infants should receive DTaP (name of whooping cough vaccine for children from age 2 months through 6 years) at 2, 4, 6 months of age and they are not protected until the full series is completed. To protect infants younger than twelve months of age not vaccinated with Tdap against pertussis, ACIP also recommends adults (e.g., parents, siblings, grandparents, childcare providers, and healthcare personnel) and children to receive Tdap at least two weeks before being in contact with the infant.

The CDC recommends that adults who have received their childhood DTP series receive a Td or Tdap booster every ten years. For adults that have not received the DTP series, the CDC recommends a three-part vaccine series followed by a Td or Tdap booster every ten years.

==== In pregnancy ====
According to guidelines of the Advisory Committee on Immunization Practices (ACIP) of the US Centers for Disease Control and Prevention (CDC), one dose of Tdap is recommended during each pregnancy to ensure protection against pertussis in newborn infants. Optimal timing to administer a dose of Tdap during each pregnancy is between 27 through 36 weeks gestation. If Tdap is administered early in pregnancy, it is not recommended to administer again during the 27 through 36 weeks gestation period as only one dose is recommended during pregnancy. In October 2022, Boostrix (Tetanus Toxoid, Reduced Diphtheria Toxoid and Acellular Pertussis Vaccine, Adsorbed [Tdap]) was approved for immunization during the third trimester of pregnancy to prevent pertussis, commonly known as whooping cough, in infants younger than two months of age.

Pregnant women who have not previously vaccinated with Tdap (i.e., have never received DTP, DTaP, or DT as child or Td or TT as an adult) are recommended to receive a series of three Td vaccinations starting during pregnancy to ensure protection against maternal and neonatal tetanus. In such cases, administration of Tdap is recommended after 20 weeks' gestation, and in earlier pregnancy a single dose of Tdap can be substituted for one dose of Td, and then the series completed with Td. For pregnant women not previously vaccinated with Tdap, if Tdap is not administered during pregnancy, it should be administered immediately postpartum. Postpartum administration of TDaP is not equivalent to administration of the vaccination during pregnancy. Because the vaccine is administered postpartum, the mother is unable to develop antibodies that can be transferred to the infant in utero, consequently, leaving the infant vulnerable to the diseases preventable by the Tdap Vaccine. Postpartum administration of the TdaP vaccine to the mother seeks to reduce the likelihood that the mother will contract disease that can be subsequently passed on the infant, albeit there will still be a two-week period prior to the protective effects of the vaccine setting in. Postpartum administration is an extension of the concept of "cocooning", a term that refers to the full vaccination of all individuals that may come into direct contact with the infant. Cocooning, like postpartum Tdap administration, is not recommended by the CDC. Cocooning depends on ensuring full vaccination of all individuals that the infant may come into contact with, and there may be financial, administrative or personal barriers that preclude full and timely vaccination of all individuals within the "cocoon".

== Brand names ==
=== Australia ===
TDaP Vaccines in Australia
Trade name	Approval date	Comments
Adacel	2005	Adacel is indicated for active immunisation against tetanus, diphtheria and pertussis in persons aged ten years and over as a booster following primary immunisation and is informally known as 'triple antigen' in Australia.
Adacel Polio	2006	Adacel Polio is indicated for active immunization against diphtheria, tetanus, pertussis and poliomyelitis in adults, adolescents and children aged four years and older as a booster following primary immunization.

=== United States ===
As of January 2020, there are seven DTaP vaccines and two Tdap vaccines licensed and available for use in the United States. All of them are indicated as childhood vaccinations with the schedules as follows:

DTaP Vaccines in the US
Trade name	Approval date	Comments	Contraindications
Daptacel	2002	For use in ages six weeks through six years as a five-dose series at 2, 4, and 6 months (6–8 weeks apart) and at 15–20 months of age and at 4–6 years.	Severe allergic reaction (anaphylaxis) after a previous dose of Daptacel or tetanus, diphtheria, or pertussis containing vaccine.; Encephalopathy (coma, prolonged seizures, and decreased level of consciousness) within seven days of a previous dose of a pertussis containing vaccine.; Progressive neurologic disorder (spasms, epilepsy, progressive encephalopathy)
Infanrix	1997	For use in ages six weeks through six years (before the seventh birthday) as a five-dose series as: a three-dose course at 2, 5, and 6 months (4–8 weeks apart), followed by a two booster doses at 15–20 months of age and 4–6 years of age.	Severe allergic reaction (anaphylaxis) after a previous dose of Infanrix or tetanus, diphtheria, or pertussis-containing vaccine.; Encephalopathy (coma, prolonged seizures, and decreased level of consciousness) within seven days of a previous dose of a pertussis containing vaccine.; Progressive neurologic disorder (spasms, epilepsy, progressive encephalopathy)
Kinrix	2008	DTaP-IPV vaccine; also immunizes against poliomyelitis. Kinrix can be used for the fifth (last) dose in the DTaP immunization series and the fourth dose in the IPV immunization series in children aged 4–6 years old (before the seventh birthday) whose previous DTaP vaccine doses have been with Infanrix and/or Pediarix for the first three doses and Infanrix for the fourth dose.	Severe allergic reaction (anaphylaxis) after a previous dose of any vaccine containing diphtheria, tetanus, pertussis or poliovirus; Severe allergic reaction (anaphylaxis) to any ingredient in any of Kinrix's vaccines; Encephalopathy (declining level of consciousness, coma, seizure) within seven days of receiving any pertussis-containing vaccine; Progressive neurologic disorders (spasms, epilepsy)
Pediarix	2002	DTaP-IPV-HepB vaccine; also immunizes against hepatitis B and poliomyelitis as a three-dose series in infants two, four, and six months (4–8 weeks apart).	Severe allergic reaction (anaphylaxis) after a previous dose of Pediarix, any type of ingredient of Pediarix, or any other diphtheria toxoid, tetanus toxoid, pertussis-containing vaccine, inactivated poliovirus vaccine or H. influenzae type b vaccine.; Encephalopathy within seven days of pertussis-containing vaccine.; Progressive neurologic disorder of spasms, epilepsy until the condition has stabilized.
Pentacel	2008	DTaP-IPV/Hib vaccine; also immunizes against invasive Haemophilus influenza type b and poliomyelitis. It is a four-dose series given at: 2, 4, and 6 months, and at 15–18 months of age.	Severe allergic reaction (anaphylaxis) after a previous dose of Pentacel, any type of ingredient of Pentacel, or any other diphtheria toxoid, tetanus toxoid, pertussis-containing vaccine, inactivated poliovirus vaccine or H. influenzae type b vaccine.; Encephalopathy within seven days of pertussis-containing vaccine.; Progressive neurologic disorder of spasms, epilepsy until the condition has stabilized.
Quadracel	2015	DTaP-IPV vaccine; also immunizes against poliomyelitis. It is approved for use as a fifth dose for children aged 4–6 years old in the DTaP vaccination series and as a fourth or fifth dose in the inactivated polio (IPV) series.	Severe allergic reaction (anaphylaxis) after a previous dose of Quadracel, any type of ingredient of Quadracel, or any other diphtheria toxoid, tetanus toxoid, pertussis-containing vaccine, inactivated poliovirus vaccine or H. influenzae type b vaccine.; Encephalopathy within seven days of pertussis-containing vaccine.; Progressive neurologic disorder of spasms, epilepsy until the condition has stabilized.
Vaxelis	2018	Active immunization against diphtheria, tetanus, pertussis, poliomyelitis, hepatitis B, and invasive disease due to Haemophilus influenzae type b (Hib) in children aged six weeks through four years of age (prior to fifth birthday).	

TDaP Vaccines in the US
Trade name	Approval date	Comments	Contraindications
Adacel	2005	For use in ages 10 through 64 as an active booster immunization against tetanus, diphtheria, and pertussis. It may also be administered as prophylaxis for wound management. It has not been shown to be safe or effective as a primary immunization or to complete the series.	Hypersensitivity reaction (anaphylaxis) after a previous dose of Adacel, any type of ingredient of Adacel, or any other diphtheria toxoid, tetanus toxoid, pertussis-containing vaccine, inactivated poliovirus vaccine or H. influenzae type b vaccine.; Encephalopathy (coma, seizure, loss of consciousness) within seven days of pertussis-containing vaccine.; Progressive neurologic disorder of spasms, epilepsy until the condition has stabilized.
Boostrix	2005	For use in ages ten and older as a single intramuscular injection into the deltoid as a booster immunization against tetanus, diphtheria, and pertussis. It may also be administered as prophylaxis for wound management.	Hypersensitivity reaction (anaphylaxis) after previously receiving a vaccine containing any form of tetanus toxoid, diphtheria toxoid, or pertussis-containing antigen.; Hypersensitivity reaction (anaphylaxis) to any ingredient within a previously administered Boostrix vaccine.; Encephalopathy (coma, seizure, loss of consciousness) progression within seven days of receiving a vaccine with antigens from pertussis.
