= Tetanus vaccine =

Vaccines used to prevent tetanus

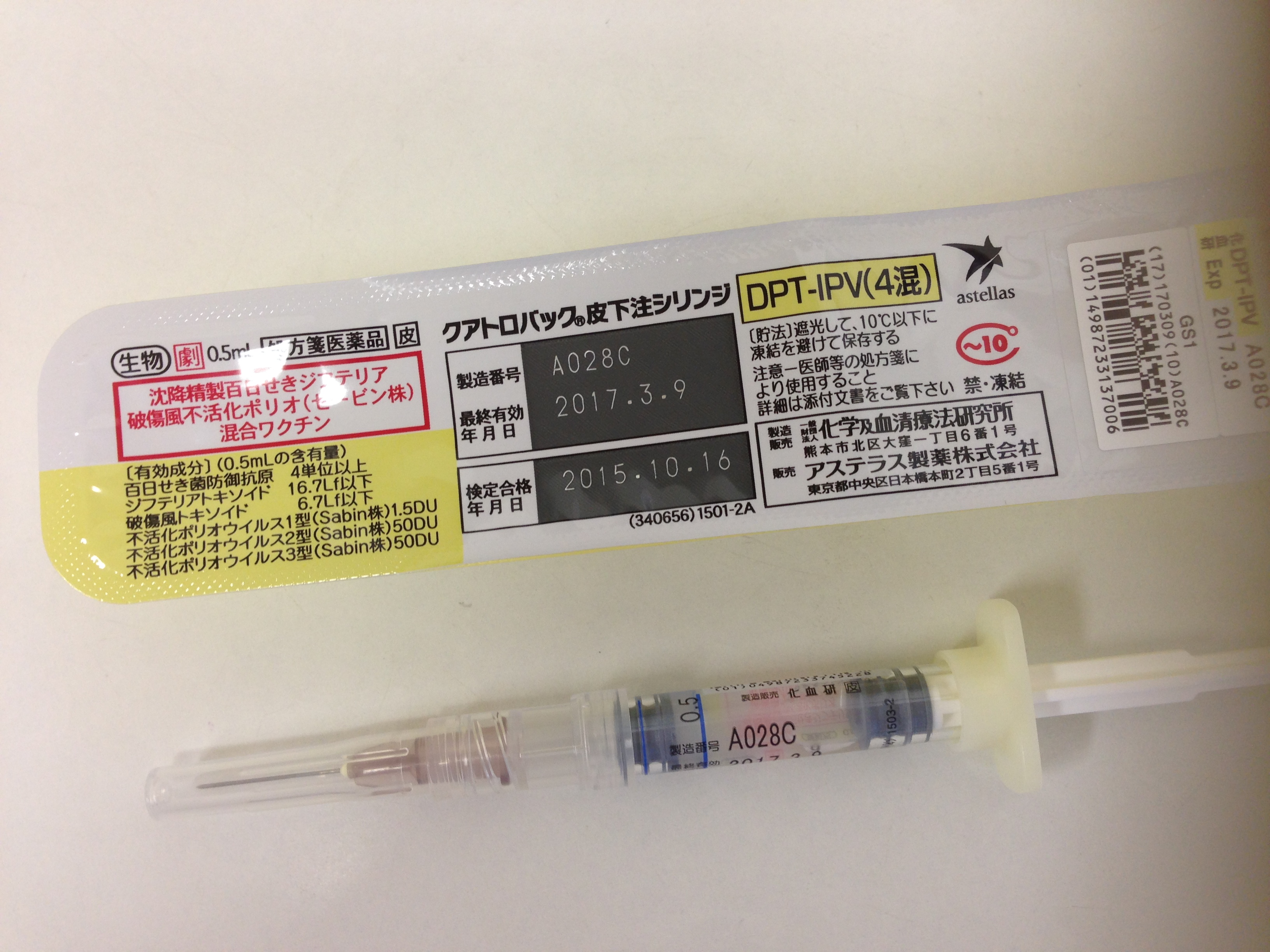
- Tetanus vaccination is often administered via combination DPT vaccines

Vaccine description
- Target: Tetanus
- Vaccine type: Toxoid

Clinical data
- MedlinePlus: a682198
- License data: US DailyMed: Tetanus
- Routes of administration: Injection
- ATC code: J07AM01 (WHO)

Legal status
- Legal status: US: ℞-only; EU: Rx-only

Identifiers
- CAS Number: 93384-51-1
- ChemSpider: none

Tetanus vaccine, also known as tetanus toxoid (TT), is a toxoid vaccine used to prevent tetanus. During childhood, five doses are recommended, with a sixth given during adolescence.

After three doses, almost everyone is initially immune, but additional doses every ten years are recommended to maintain immunity. A booster shot should be given within 48 hours of an injury to people whose immunization is out of date.

Confirming that pregnant women are up to date on tetanus immunization during each pregnancy can prevent both maternal and neonatal tetanus. The vaccine is very safe, including during pregnancy and in those with HIV/AIDS.

Redness and pain at the site of injection occur in between 25% and 85% of people. Fever, feeling tired, and minor muscle pain occurs in less than 10% of people. Severe allergic reactions occur in fewer than one in 100,000 people.

A number of vaccine combinations include the tetanus vaccine, such as DTaP and Tdap, which contain diphtheria, tetanus, and pertussis vaccines, and DT and Td, which contain diphtheria and tetanus vaccines. DTaP and DT are given to children less than seven years old, while Tdap and Td are given to those seven years old and older. The lowercase d and p denote lower strengths of diphtheria and pertussis vaccines.

Tetanus antiserum was developed in 1890, with its protective effects lasting a few weeks. The tetanus toxoid vaccine was developed in 1924, and came into common use for soldiers in World War II. Its use resulted in a 95% decrease in the rate of tetanus. It is on the World Health Organization's List of Essential Medicines.

== Medical uses ==
=== Effectiveness ===
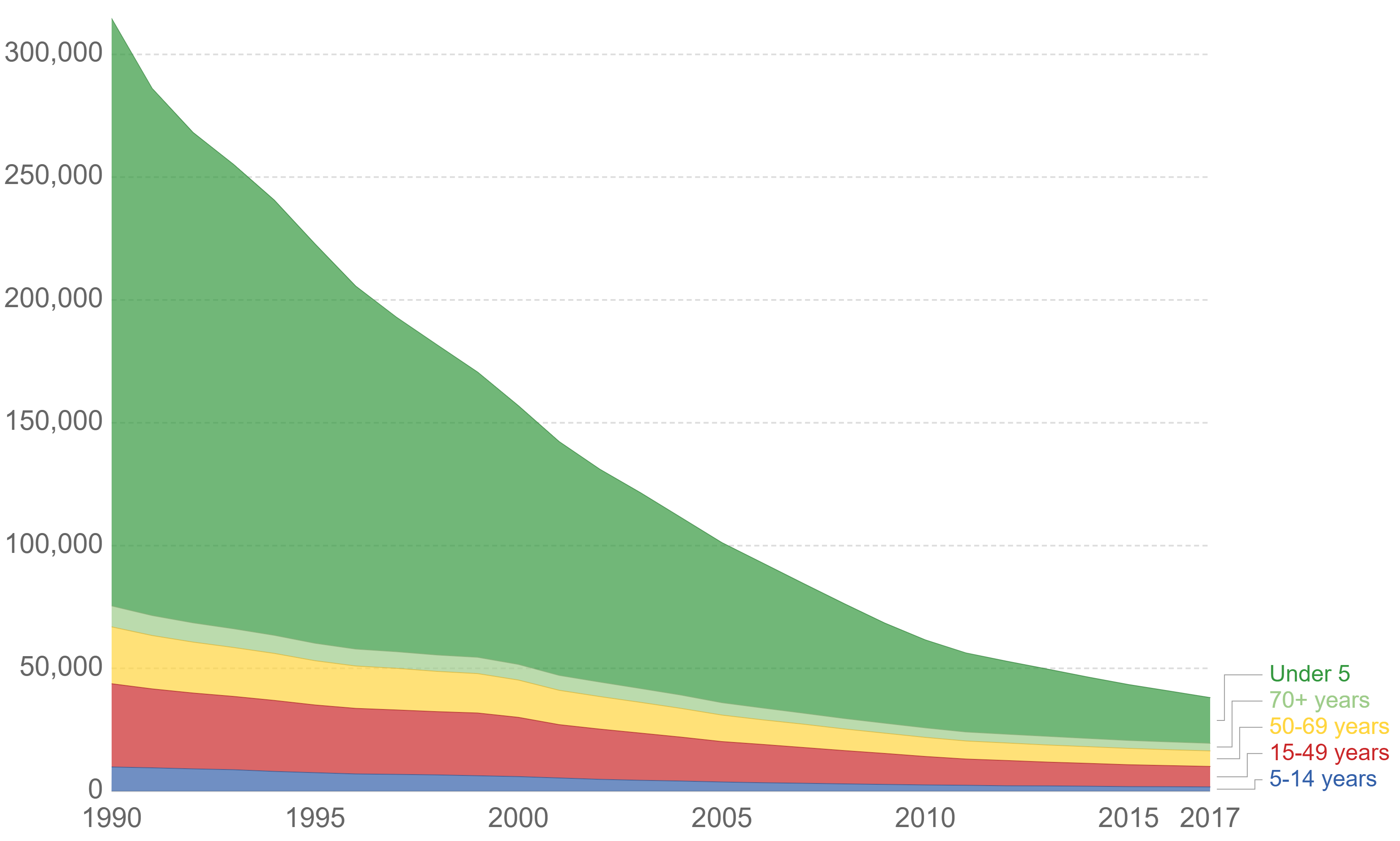
Decrease in tetanus deaths by age group between 1990 and 2017

Vaccination confers near-complete protection from tetanus, provided the individual has received their recommended booster shots. Globally, deaths from tetanus in newborns decreased from 787,000 in 1988 to 58,000 in 2010, and 34,000 deaths in 2015 (a 96% decrease from 1988). In the 1940s, before the vaccine, there were about 550 cases of tetanus per year in the United States, which has decreased to about 30 cases per year in the 2000s. Nearly all cases are among those who have never received a vaccine, or adults who have not stayed up to date on their 10-year booster shots.

=== Pregnancy ===
Guidelines on prenatal care in the United States specify that women should receive a dose of the Tdap vaccine during each pregnancy, preferably between weeks 27 and 36, to allow antibody transfer to the fetus. All postpartum women who have not previously received the Tdap vaccine are recommended to get it prior to discharge after delivery. It is recommended for pregnant women who have never received the tetanus vaccine (i.e., neither DTP or DTaP, nor DT as a child or Td or TT as an adult) to receive a series of three Td vaccinations starting during pregnancy to ensure protection against maternal and neonatal tetanus. In such cases, Tdap is recommended to be substituted for one dose of Td, again preferably between 27 and 36 weeks of gestation, and then the series completed with Td.

=== Specific types ===
The first vaccine is given in infancy. The baby is injected with the DTaP vaccine, which is three inactive toxins in one injection. DTaP protects against diphtheria, pertussis, and tetanus. This acellular vaccine is safer than the previously used DTP with whole inactivated pertussis (now retroactively notated DTwP). Another option is DT, which is a combination of diphtheria and tetanus vaccines. This is given as an alternative to infants who have conflicts with the DTaP vaccine. Quadrivalent, pentavalent, and hexavalent formulations contain DTaP with one or more of the additional vaccines: inactivated polio virus vaccine (IPV), Haemophilus influenzae type b conjugate, Hepatitis B, with the availability varying in different countries.

For the every ten-year booster Td or Tdap may be used, though Tdap is more expensive.

=== Schedule ===
Because DTaP and DT are administered to children less than a year old, the recommended location for injection is the anterolateral thigh muscle. However, these vaccines can be injected into the deltoid muscle if necessary.

The World Health Organization (WHO) recommends six doses in childhood starting at six weeks of age. Four doses of DTaP are to be given in early childhood. The first dose should be around two months of age, the second at four months, the third at six, and the fourth from fifteen to eighteen months of age. There is a recommended fifth dose to be administered to four- to six-year-olds.

Td and Tdap are for older children, adolescents, and adults and can be injected into the deltoid muscle. These are boosters and are recommended every ten years. It is safe to have shorter intervals between a single dose of Tdap and a dose of the Td booster.

==== Additional doses ====
Booster shots are important because lymphocyte production (antibodies) is not at a constant high rate of activity. This is because after the introduction of the vaccine when lymphocyte production is high, the production activity of white blood cells will start to decline. The decline in activity of the T-helper cells means that there must be a booster to help keep the white blood cells active.

Td and Tdap are the booster shots given every ten years to maintain immunity for adults nineteen years of age to sixty-five years of age.

Tdap is given as a one-time, first-time-only dose that includes the tetanus, diphtheria, and acellular pertussis vaccinations. This should not be administered to those who are under the age of eleven or over the age of sixty-five.

Td is the booster shot given to people over the age of seven and includes the tetanus and diphtheria toxoids. However, Td has less of the diphtheria toxoid, which is why the "d" is lowercase and the "T" is capitalized.

In 2020, the US Centers for Disease Control and Prevention (CDC) Advisory Committee on Immunization Practices (ACIP) recommended that either tetanus and diphtheria toxoids (Td) vaccine or Tdap to be used for the decennial Td booster, tetanus prevention during wound management, and for additional required doses in the catch-up immunization schedule if a person has received at least one Tdap dose.

== Side effects ==
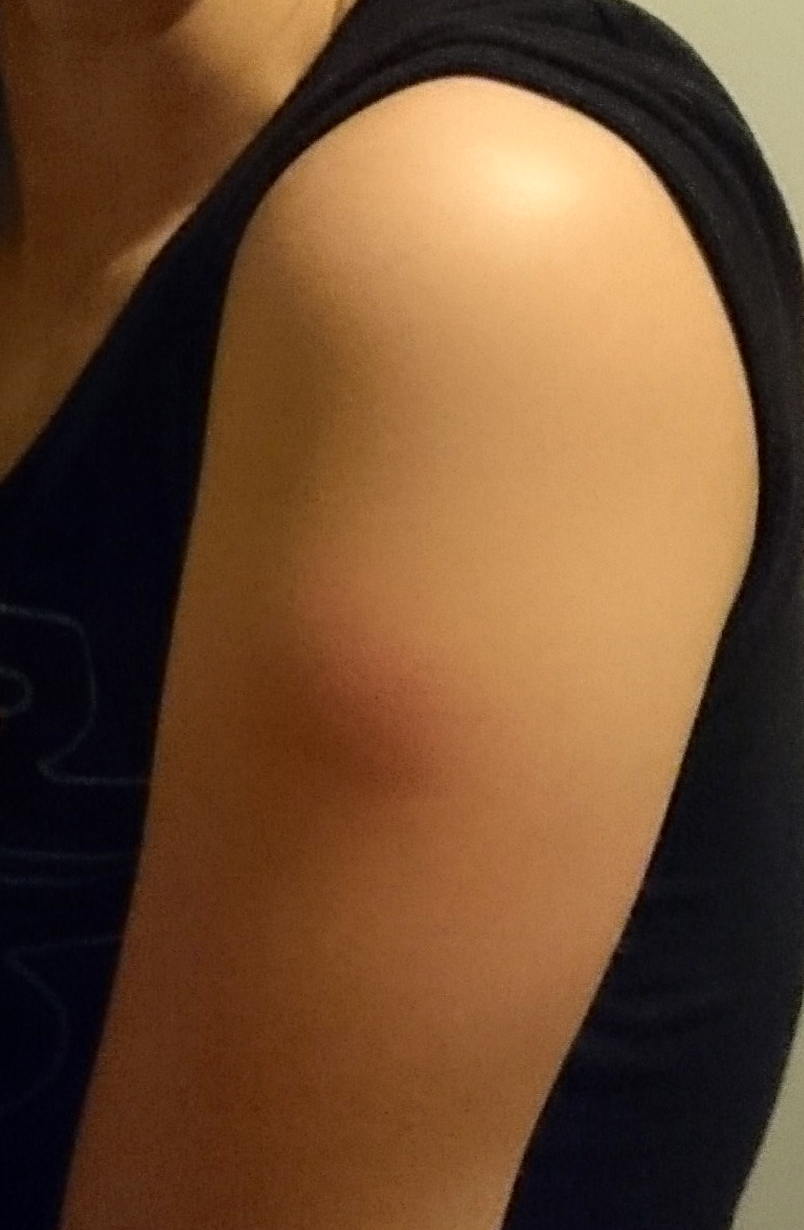
A bump resulting from a tetanus vaccine injection

Common side effects of the tetanus vaccine include fever, redness, and swelling with soreness or tenderness around the injection site (one in five people have redness or swelling). Body aches and tiredness have been reported following Tdap. Td / Tdap can cause painful swelling of the entire arm in one of 500 people. Tetanus toxoid containing vaccines (DTaP, DTP, Tdap, Td, DT) may cause brachial neuritis at a rate of one out of every 100,000 to 200,000 doses.

== Mechanism of action ==
Vaccination generates artificial active immunity. This type of immunity is generated when a dead or weakened version of the disease enters the body, causing an immune response which includes the production of antibodies. This is beneficial because it means that if the disease is ever introduced into the body, the immune system will recognize the antigen and produce antibodies more rapidly.

In the case of the tetanus toxoid vaccine, the tetanus bacterium Clostridium tetani is grown artificially in a broth. The toxin is harvested from the mass of bacteria and then detoxfied using formaldehyde, forming the toxoid. Formaldehyde prevents the toxin from carrying out its toxic function but still preserve most of the epitopes of the original toxin. As a result, an immune system trained against the toxoid will recognize the real toxin.

== History ==
The first vaccine for passive immunology was discovered by a group of German scientists under the leadership of Emil von Behring in 1890. The first inactive tetanus toxoid was discovered and produced in 1924 by the French scientist Gaston Ramon. A more effective adsorbed version of the vaccine, created in 1938, was proven to be successful when it was used to prevent tetanus in the military during World War II. DTP/DTwP (which is the combined vaccine for diphtheria, tetanus, and pertussis) was first used in 1948, and was continued until 1991, when it was replaced with an acellular form of the pertussis vaccine due to safety concerns. Half of those who received the DT(w)P vaccine had redness, swelling, and pain around the injection site, which convinced researchers to find a replacement vaccine.

Two new vaccines were launched in 1992. These combined tetanus and diphtheria with acellular pertussis (TDaP or DTaP), which could be given to adolescents and adults (as opposed to previously when the vaccine was only given to children).

== Research ==
=== Recombinant vaccine ===
The production of tetanus toxoid is laborious and prone to potency variation. Recombinant protein technology allows a protein to be mass produced in a transgenic microbe in a more standardized way. A Chinese recombinant tetanus vaccine, which contained the immunogenic Hc domain of the toxin, finished phase 1/2 trial in 2021. The Hc domain is responsible for binding to neuronal cells but cannot elicit damage on its own.
