= Victor Fourgeaud =

Victor J. Fourgeaud
- Born: c. 1815
- Died: 1875 (aged 59–60)
- Occupations: Doctor, Legislator

Victor Fourgeaud (c. 1815 - 1875) was a San Francisco medical doctor and legislator. He is known for his work on epidemic of diphtheria in California. Fourgeaud made use of acid for treatment of diphtheria, which was probably ineffective.
