= Toxoid =

Weakened form of a toxin, often used for vaccines

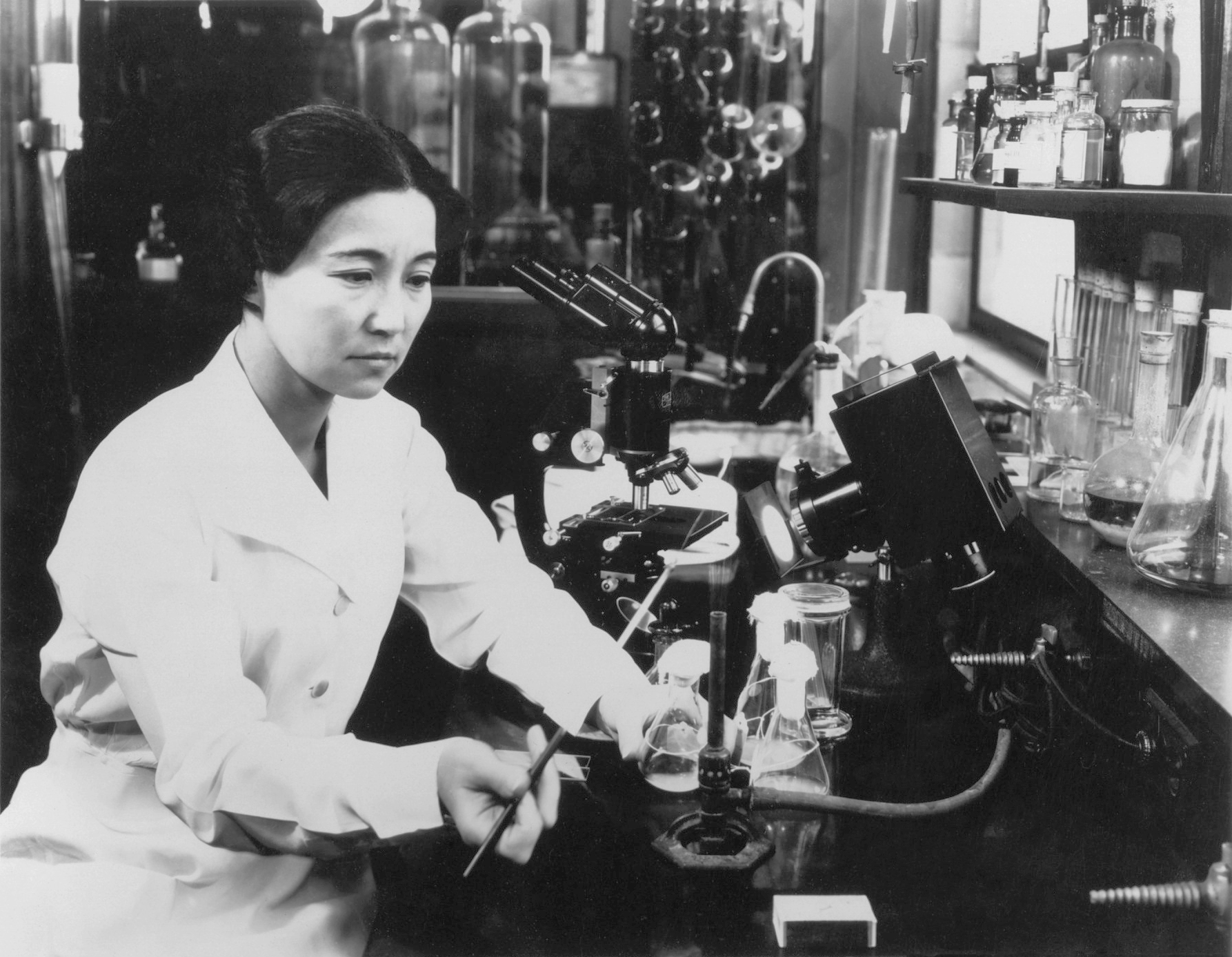
Ruby Hirose researching serums and antitoxins

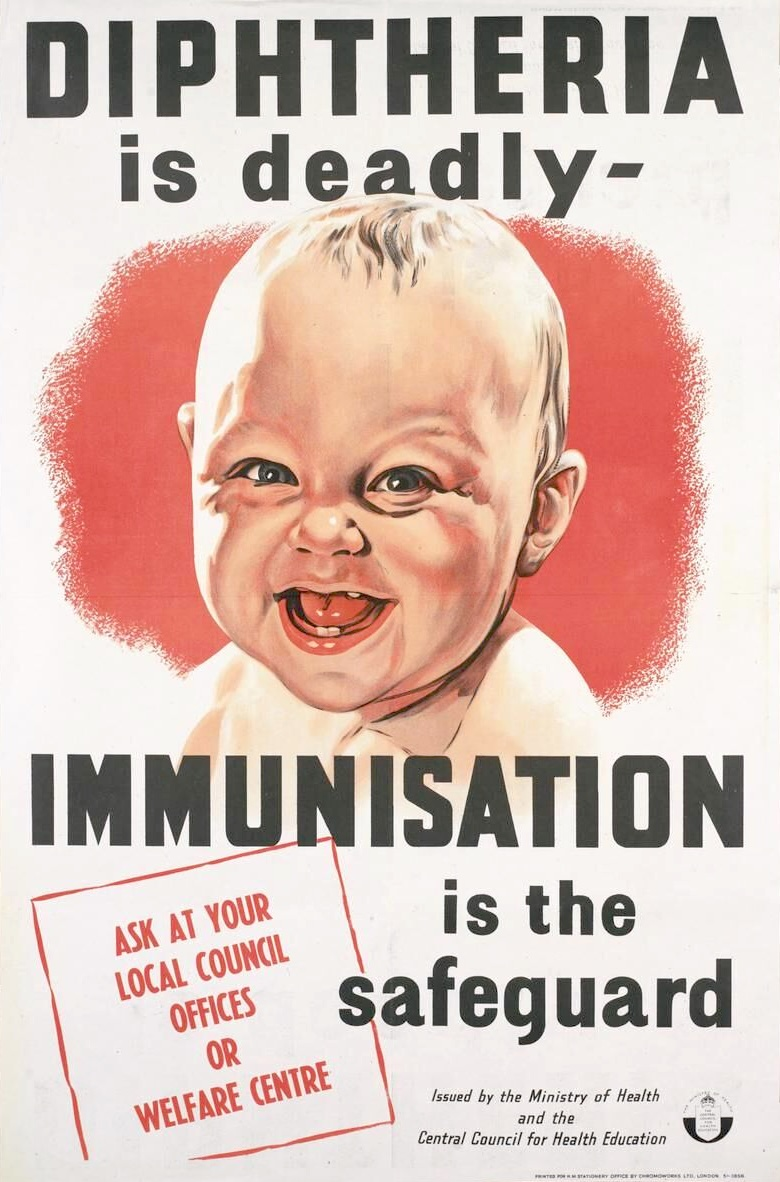
A poster released by the Central Council for Health Education, spreading awareness about Diphtheria.

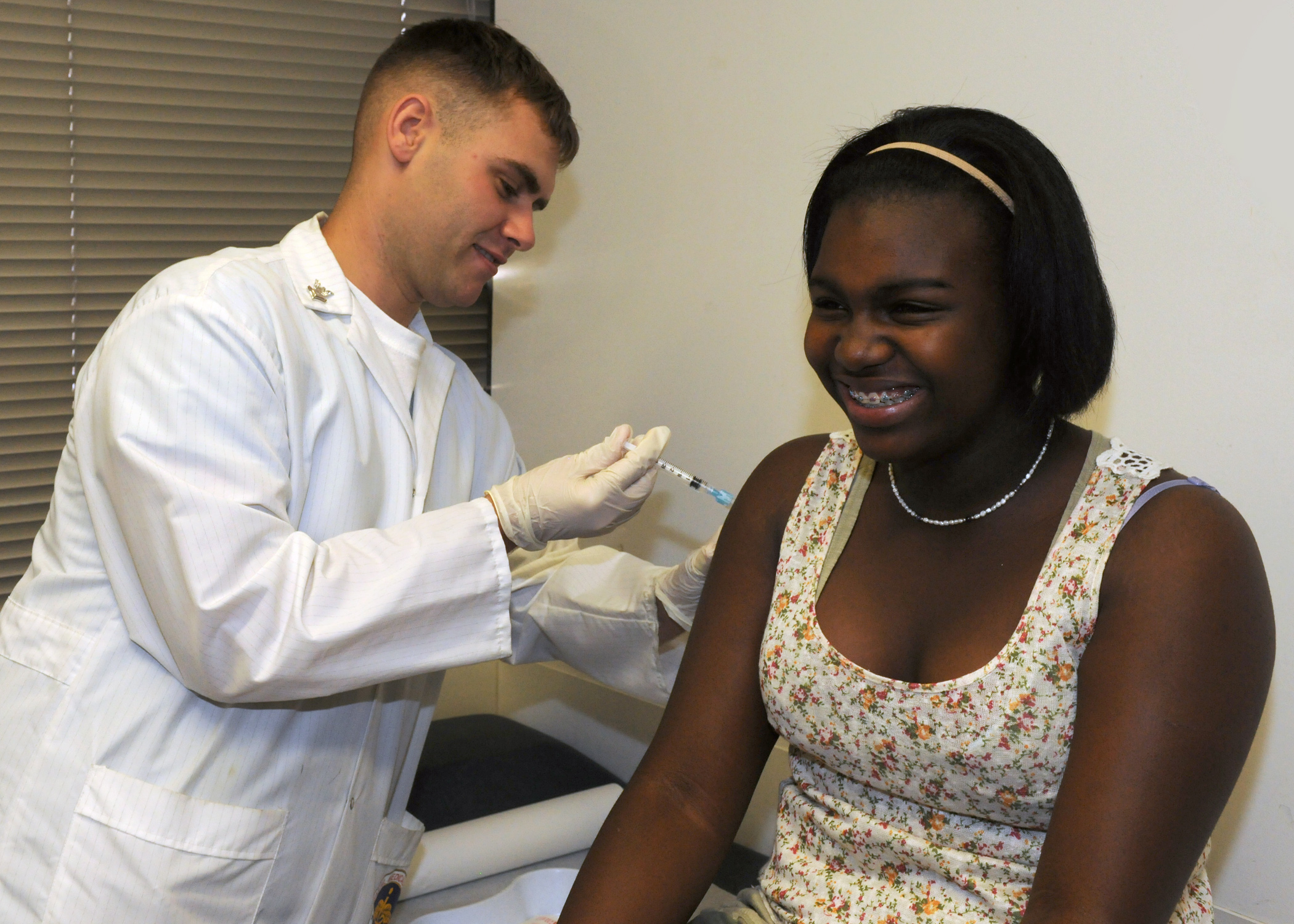
A tetanus vaccine is being administered at the Naval medical Center San Diego

A toxoid is an inactivated toxin (usually an exotoxin) whose toxicity has been suppressed while retaining its immunogenicity. This is usually achieved by chemical (formalin) or heat treatment. Toxins are secreted by bacteria, whereas toxoids are altered form of toxins; toxoids are not secreted by bacteria. Thus, when used during vaccination, an immune response is mounted and immunological memory is formed against the molecular markers of the toxoid without resulting in toxin-induced illness. Such a preparation is also known as an anatoxin. There are toxoids for prevention of diphtheria, tetanus and botulism.

Toxoids are used as vaccines because they induce an immune response to the original toxin or increase the response to another antigen since the toxoid markers and toxin markers are preserved. For example, the tetanus toxoid is derived from the tetanospasmin produced by Clostridium tetani. The latter causes tetanus and is vaccinated against by the DTaP vaccine. While patients may sometimes complain of side effects after a vaccine, these are associated with the process of mounting an immune response and clearing the toxoid, not the direct effects of the toxoid. The toxoid does not have virulence as the toxin did before inactivation.

Toxoids are also useful in the production of human antitoxins. Multiple doses of tetanus toxoid are used by many plasma centers in the United States for the development of highly immune persons for the production of human anti-tetanus immune globulin (tetanus immune globulin (TIG), HyperTet (c)), which has replaced horse serum-type tetanus antitoxin in most of the developed world.

Toxoids are also used in the production of conjugate vaccines. The highly antigenic toxoids help draw attention to weaker antigens such as polysaccharides found in the bacterial capsule.

== List of toxoids ==
Toxin	Organism	Toxoid
Tetanus toxin	Clostridium tetani	Tetanus toxoid
Diphtheria toxin	Corynebacterium diphtheriae	Diphtheria toxoid
Botulinum toxin	Clostridium botulinum	Botulinum toxoid
Pertussis toxin	Bordetella pertussis	"Bordetella pertussis toxoid antigen" (see pertussis vaccine)
Tracheal cytotoxin	Bordetella pertussis	
Erythrogenic toxin	Streptococcus pyogenes	(PMID 10948118, 10925320)
Leukocidin, Streptolysins	Streptococcus pyogenes	
Clostridial a-toxin	Clostridial perfringens	(PMID 4306752)
Cholera toxin	Vibrio cholerae	(Used in experimental TA-CD)
Anthrax toxin	Bacillus anthracis	(see anthrax vaccines)
Staphylococcal enterotoxin	Staphylococcus aureus	(PMID 30824769)
Toxic shock syndrome toxin	Staphylococcus aureus	(PMID 30824769)
Pseudomonas exotoxin A	Pseudomonas aeruginosa	(Unnamed; used in Vi-rEPA)

== Mechanism of production ==
=== Formaldehyde ===
Formaldehyde seems to inactivate toxins by inducing crosslinking. Overzealous use of formaldehyde can lead to aggregation.

=== Recombinant ===
A minority of sources refer to toxins with the dangerous parts genetically edited out and produced using recombinant protein technology as a "recombiant toxoid". Other sources simply call such things a regular recombinant antigen.
