= Diphtheria =

Bacterial disease

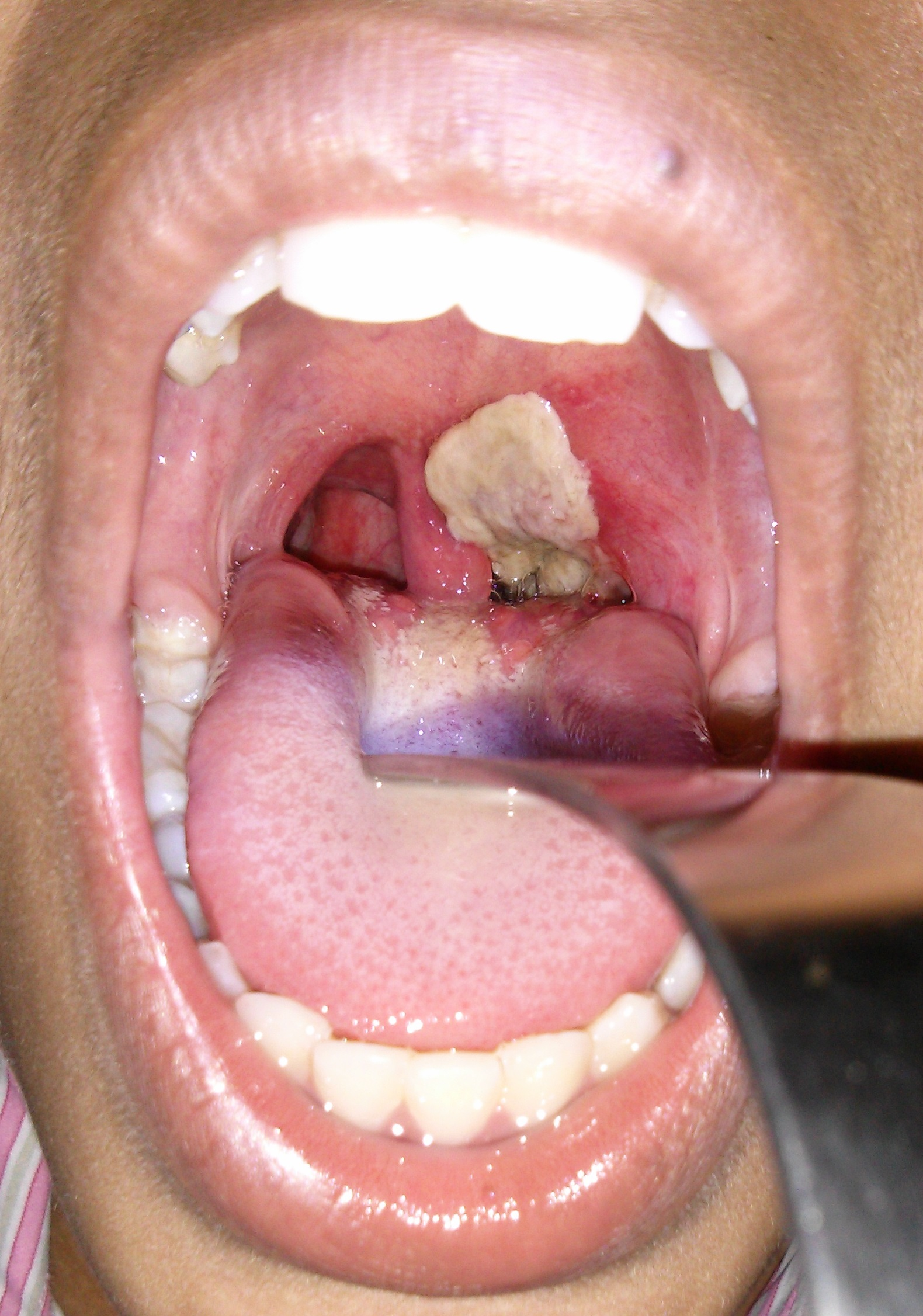
- An adherent, dense, grey pseudomembrane covering the tonsils is classically seen in diphtheria.
- Specialty: Infectious disease
- Symptoms: Sore throat, fever, barking cough
- Complications: Myocarditis, Peripheral neuropathy, Proteinuria
- Usual onset: 2–5 days post-exposure
- Causes: Corynebacterium diphtheriae (spread by direct contact and through the air)
- Diagnostic method: Examination of throat, culture
- Prevention: Diphtheria vaccine
- Treatment: Antibiotics, tracheostomy
- Prognosis: 5–10% risk of death
- Frequency: 4,500 (reported 2015)
- Deaths: 2,100 (2015)

Diphtheria is an infection caused by the bacterium Corynebacterium diphtheriae. Most infections are asymptomatic or have a mild clinical course, but in some outbreaks, the mortality rate approaches 10%.

Signs and symptoms may vary from mild to severe, and usually start two to five days after exposure. Symptoms often develop gradually, beginning with a sore throat and fever. In severe cases, a grey or white patch develops in the throat called a pseudomembrane. This tough, leathery membrane slowly blocks the airway. Starting with a barking cough, similar to that observed in croup, the neck may also swell, in part due to the enlargement of the facial lymph nodes. The pseudomembrane can grow to cover a wide area of the throat, leading to strangulation and death.

Diphtheria can also involve the skin, eyes, or genitals, and can cause complications, including myocarditis (which in itself can result in an abnormal heart rate), inflammation of nerves (which can result in paralysis), kidney problems, and bleeding problems due to low levels of platelets.

Diphtheria is usually spread between people by direct contact, through the air, or through contact with contaminated objects. Asymptomatic transmission and chronic infection are also possible. Different strains of C. diphtheriae are the main cause in the variability of lethality. The lethality and symptoms themselves are caused by the exotoxin produced by the bacteria. Diagnosis can often be made based on the appearance of the throat, with confirmation by microbiological culture. Previous infection may not protect against reinfection.

A diphtheria vaccine is effective for prevention and is available in several formulations. Three or four doses, given along with tetanus vaccine and pertussis vaccine, are recommended during childhood. Further doses of the diphtheria–tetanus vaccine are recommended every ten years. Protection can be verified by measuring the antitoxin level in the blood. Diphtheria can be prevented in those exposed, as well as treated with the antibiotics erythromycin or benzylpenicillin. In severe cases a tracheotomy may be needed to open the airway.

In 2015, 4,500 cases were officially reported worldwide, down from nearly 100,000 in 1980. About a million cases a year are believed to have occurred before the 1980s. Diphtheria currently occurs most often in sub-Saharan Africa, South Asia, and Indonesia. In 2015, it resulted in 2,100 deaths, down from 8,000 deaths in 1990.

In areas where it is still common, children are most affected. It is rare in the developed world due to widespread vaccination, but can re-emerge if vaccination rates decrease. In the United States, 57 cases were reported between 1980 and 2004 and only 11 cases from 2000 to 2025. Death occurs in 5–10% of those diagnosed. The disease was first described in the 5th century BC by Hippocrates. The bacterium was identified in 1882 by Edwin Klebs.

== Signs and symptoms ==
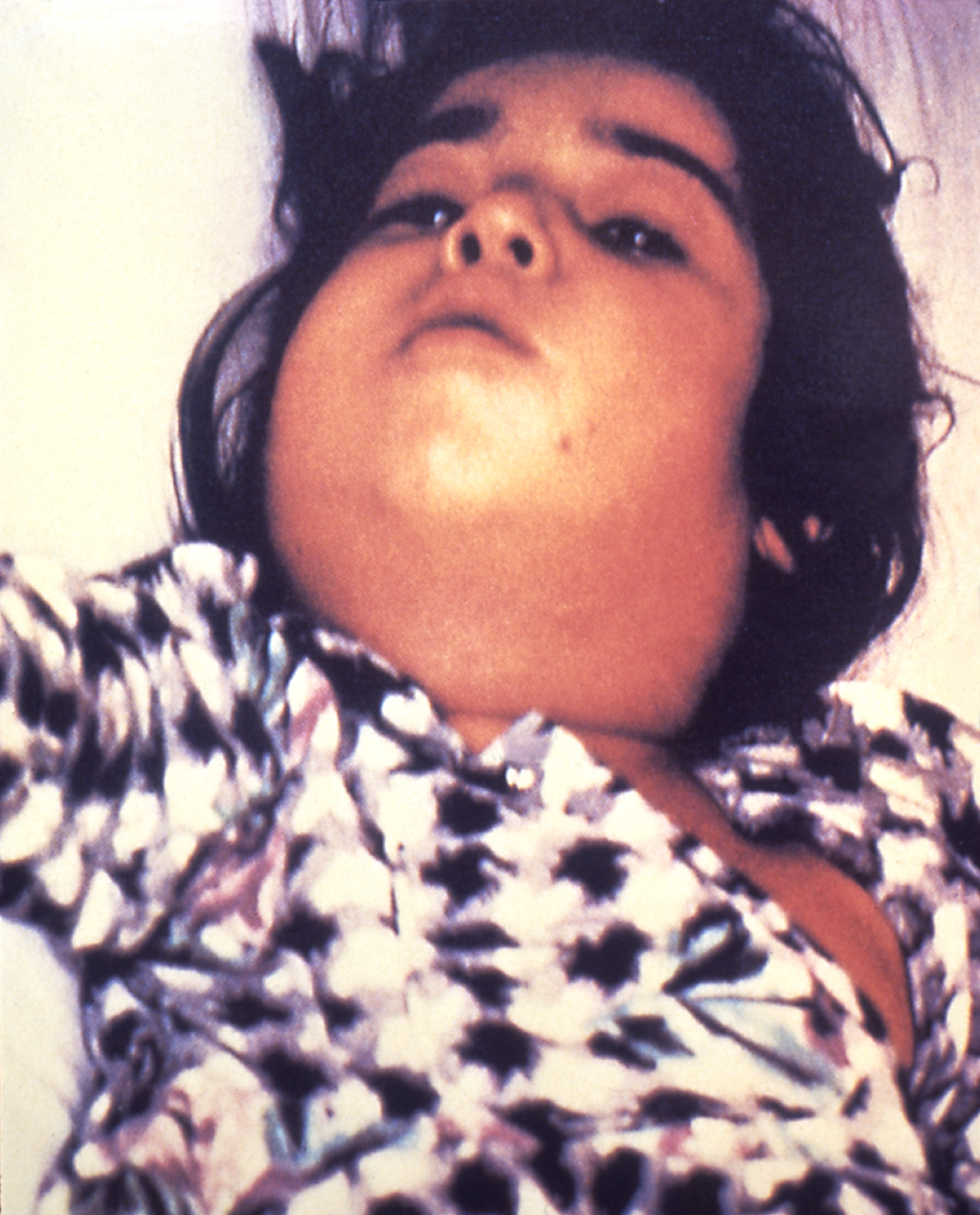
Diphtheria can cause a swollen neck, sometimes referred to as a bull neck.

The symptoms of diphtheria usually begin two to seven days after infection. They include fever of 38 °C (100.4 °F) or above; chills; fatigue; bluish skin coloration (cyanosis); sore throat; hoarseness; cough; headache; difficulty swallowing; painful swallowing; difficulty breathing; rapid breathing; foul-smelling and bloodstained nasal discharge; and lymphadenopathy. Within two to three days, diphtheria may destroy healthy tissues in the respiratory system. The dead tissue forms a thick, gray coating, known as a pseudo membrane, that can build up in the throat or nose. It can cover tissues in the nose, tonsils, voice box, and throat, making it very hard to breathe and swallow. Symptoms can also include cardiac arrhythmias, myocarditis, and cranial and peripheral nerve palsies.

=== Diphtheritic croup ===
Laryngeal diphtheria can lead to a characteristic swollen neck and throat, or "bull neck". The swollen throat is often accompanied by a serious respiratory condition, characterized by a brassy or "barking" cough, stridor, hoarseness, and difficulty breathing; and historically referred to variously as "diphtheritic croup", "true croup", or sometimes simply as "croup". Diphtheritic croup is extremely rare in countries where diphtheria vaccination is customary. As a result, the term "croup" nowadays most often refers to an unrelated viral illness that produces similar but milder respiratory symptoms.

== Transmission ==
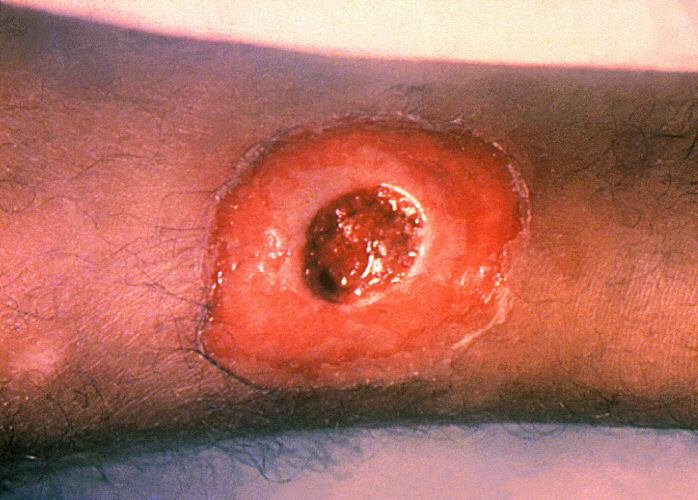
A diphtheria skin lesion on the leg

Human-to-human transmission of diphtheria typically occurs through the air when an infected individual coughs or sneezes. Breathing in particles released from the infected individual leads to infection. Contact with any lesions on the skin can also lead to transmission of diphtheria, but this cause is uncommon. Indirect infections can occur, as well. If an infected individual touches a surface or object, the bacteria can be left behind and remain viable. Also, some evidence indicates diphtheria has the potential to be zoonotic, but this has yet to be confirmed. Corynebacterium ulcerans has been found in some animals, which would suggest zoonotic potential.

== Mechanism ==
Diphtheria toxin (DT) is produced only by C. diphtheriae infected with a certain type of bacteriophage. Toxinogenicity is determined by phage conversion (also called lysogenic conversion); i.e., the ability of the bacterium to make DT changes as a consequence of infection by a particular phage. DT is encoded by the tox gene. Strains of corynephage are either tox^{+} (e.g., corynephage β) or tox^{−} (e.g., corynephage γ). The tox gene becomes integrated into the bacterial genome. The chromosome of C. diphtheriae has two different but functionally equivalent bacterial attachment sites (attB) for integration of β prophage into the chromosome.

The diphtheria toxin precursor is a protein of molecular weight 60 kDa. Certain proteases, such as trypsin, selectively cleave DT to generate two peptide chains, amino-terminal fragment A (DT-A) and carboxyl-terminal fragment B (DT-B), which are held together by a disulfide bond. DT-B is a recognition subunit that gains entry of DT into the host cell by binding to the EGF-like domain of heparin-binding EGF-like growth factor on the cell surface. This signals the cell to internalize the toxin within an endosome via receptor-mediated endocytosis. Inside the endosome, DT is split by a trypsin-like protease into DT-A and DT-B. The acidity of the endosome causes DT-B to create pores in the endosome membrane, thereby catalysing the release of DT-A into the cytoplasm.

Fragment A inhibits the synthesis of new proteins in the affected cell by catalyzing ADP-ribosylation of elongation factor EF-2—a protein that is essential to the translation step of protein synthesis. This ADP-ribosylation involves the transfer of an ADP-ribose from NAD+ to a diphthamide (a modified histidine) residue within the EF-2 protein. Since EF-2 is needed for the moving of tRNA from the A-site to the P-site of the ribosome during protein translation, ADP-ribosylation of EF-2 prevents protein synthesis.

ADP-ribosylation of EF-2 is reversed in vitro by high doses of nicotinamide (a form of vitamin B_{3}), since this is one of the reaction's end products, and high amounts drive the reaction in the opposite direction.

== Diagnosis ==
The current clinical case definition of diphtheria used by the United States' Centers for Disease Control and Prevention is based on both laboratory and clinical criteria.

=== Laboratory criteria ===
- Isolation of C. diphtheriae from a Gram stain or throat culture from a clinical specimen.
- Histopathologic diagnosis of diphtheria by Albert's stain.

=== Toxin demonstration ===
- In vivo tests (guinea pig inoculation): Subcutaneous and intracutaneous tests.
- In vitro test: Elek's gel precipitation test, detection of tox gene by PCR, ELISA, ICA.

=== Clinical criteria ===
- Upper respiratory tract illness with sore throat.
- Low-grade fever (above 39 °C (102 °F) is rare).
- An adherent, dense, grey pseudomembrane covering the posterior aspect of the pharynx; in severe cases, it can extend to cover the entire tracheobronchial tree.

=== Case classification ===
- Probable: a clinically compatible case that is not laboratory-confirmed, and is not epidemiologically linked to a laboratory-confirmed case.
- Confirmed: a clinically compatible case that is either laboratory-confirmed or epidemiologically linked to a laboratory-confirmed case.

Empirical treatment should generally be started in a patient in whom suspicion of diphtheria is high.

== Prevention ==
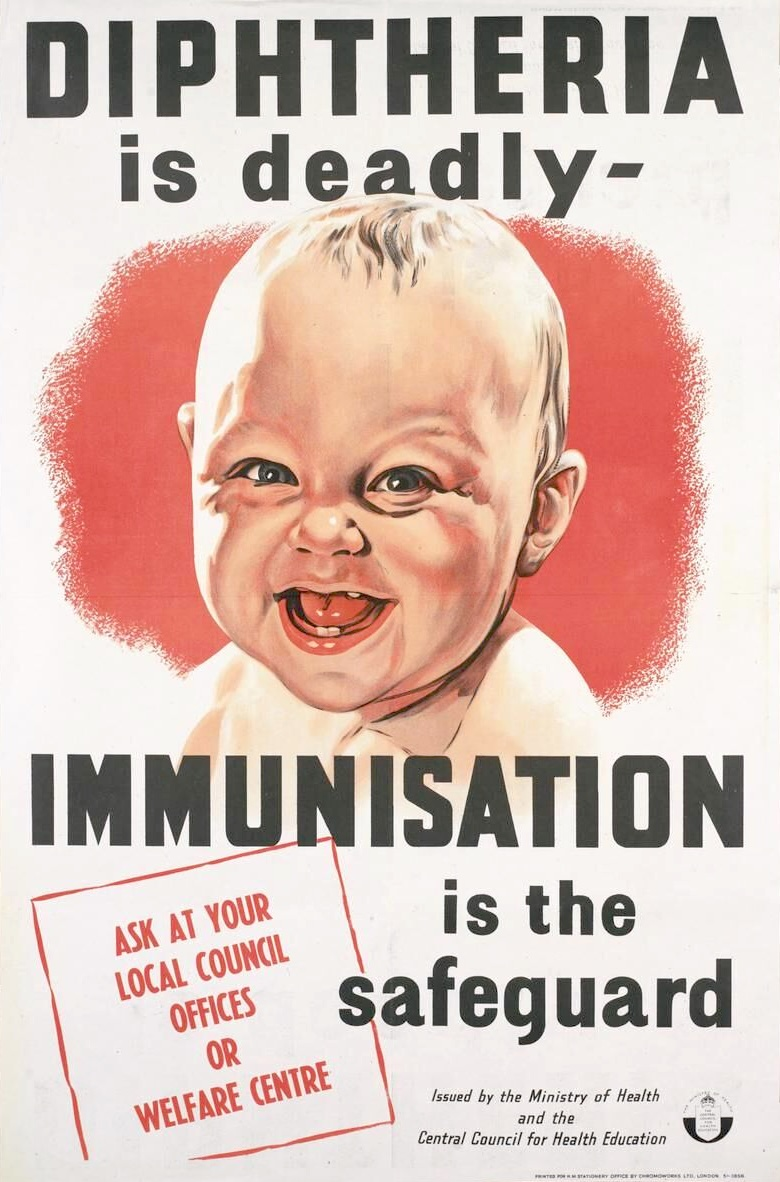
Diphtheria prevention poster from the UK (around 1939–1945)

Diphtheria prevention relies primarily on vaccination with the diphtheria toxoid, an inactivated form of the toxin produced by Corynebacterium diphtheriae. Introduced in the 1920s and widely adopted after World War II, the toxoid vaccine triggers strong antitoxin immunity that prevents the severe respiratory and systemic effects of the disease. Today, it is administered as part of combination vaccines such as DTaP (for children) and Tdap or Td (for adolescents and adults), with booster doses recommended every 10 years to maintain protection. Widespread immunization has reduced diphtheria from a common childhood killer to a rare disease in most countries, though cases can still occur in areas with low vaccination coverage.

Pentavalent vaccines, which vaccinate against diphtheria and four other childhood diseases simultaneously (diphtheria, tetanus, pertussis [whooping cough], hepatitis B, and haemophilus influenzae type b [Hib]), are frequently used in disease prevention programs in developing countries by organizations such as UNICEF.

== Treatment ==
The disease may remain manageable, but in more severe cases, lymph nodes in the neck may swell, and breathing and swallowing are more difficult. People in this stage should seek immediate medical attention, as obstruction in the throat may require intubation or a tracheotomy. Abnormal cardiac rhythms can occur early in the course of the illness or weeks later, and can lead to heart failure. Diphtheria can also cause paralysis in the eye, neck, throat, or respiratory muscles. Patients with severe cases are put in a hospital intensive care unit, and given diphtheria antitoxin (consisting of antibodies isolated from the serum of horses that have been challenged with diphtheria toxin). Since antitoxin does not neutralize toxin that is already bound to tissues, delaying its administration increases the risk of death. Therefore, the decision to administer diphtheria antitoxin is based on clinical diagnosis, and should not await laboratory confirmation.

Antibiotics have not been demonstrated to affect the healing of local infection in diphtheria patients treated with antitoxin. Antibiotics are used in patients or carriers to eradicate C. diphtheriae, and prevent its transmission to others. The Centers for Disease Control and Prevention (CDC) recommends either:

- Metronidazole
- Erythromycin is given (orally or by injection) for 14 days (40 mg/kg per day with a maximum of 2 g/d), or
- Procaine penicillin G is given intramuscularly for 14 days (300,000 U/d for patients weighing <10 kg, and 600,000 U/d for those weighing >10 kg); patients with allergies to penicillin G or erythromycin can use rifampin or clindamycin.

In cases that progress beyond a throat infection, diphtheria toxin spreads through the blood and can lead to potentially life-threatening complications that affect other organs, such as the heart and kidneys. Damage to the heart caused by the toxin affects the heart's ability to pump blood or the kidneys' ability to clear wastes. It can also cause nerve damage, eventually leading to paralysis. About 40–50% of those left untreated can die.

== Epidemiology ==
Disability-adjusted life year for diphtheria per 100,000 inhabitants in 2004: no data ≤ 1 1–2 2–3 3–4 4–5 5–6 6–7 7–9 9–10 10–15 15–50 ≥ 50

Diphtheria cases reported to the World Health Organization between 1997 and 2006: no data 1–49 reported cases Between 50–99 reported cases Over 100 reported cases

Diphtheria is fatal in 5–10% of cases. In children under five years and adults over 40 years, the fatality rate may be as high as 20%. In 2013, it resulted in 3,300 deaths, down from 8,000 deaths in 1990. Better standards of living, mass immunization, improved diagnosis, prompt treatment, and more effective health care have led to a decrease in cases worldwide.

== History ==
Records of diphtheria begin as early as the 5th century BCE in the writings of Hippocrates. Epidemics were first described by Aëtius of Amida in the 6th century.

Before 1826, diphtheria was known by different names across the world. In England, it was known as "Boulogne sore throat", as the illness had spread from France. In 1826, Pierre Bretonneau gave the disease the name diphthérite (from Greek διφθέρα, diphthera 'leather'), describing the appearance of pseudomembrane in the throat.

In 1883 Edwin Klebs identified the bacterium causing diphtheria, and named it Klebs–Loeffler bacterium. The club shape of this bacterium helped Edwin to differentiate it from other bacteria. Over time, it has been called Microsporon diphtheriticum, Bacillus diphtheriae, and Mycobacterium diphtheriae. Current nomenclature is Corynebacterium diphtheriae.

In 1884 German bacteriologist Friedrich Loeffler became the first person known to cultivate C. diphtheriae. Löffler found that the bacteria were always present in the mucous membranes of the larynx and trachea of patients with diphtheria. In the process of finding the bacteria, he isolated the organism, cultured it, and reproduced the disease in susceptible animals (guinea pigs and rabbits), and then recovered the same bacillus from the diseased animal, thus fulfilling Koch's postulates. He believed there was a toxin that was made by the bacteria that caused the disease symptoms, and subsequently showed that some animals are immune to diphtheria.

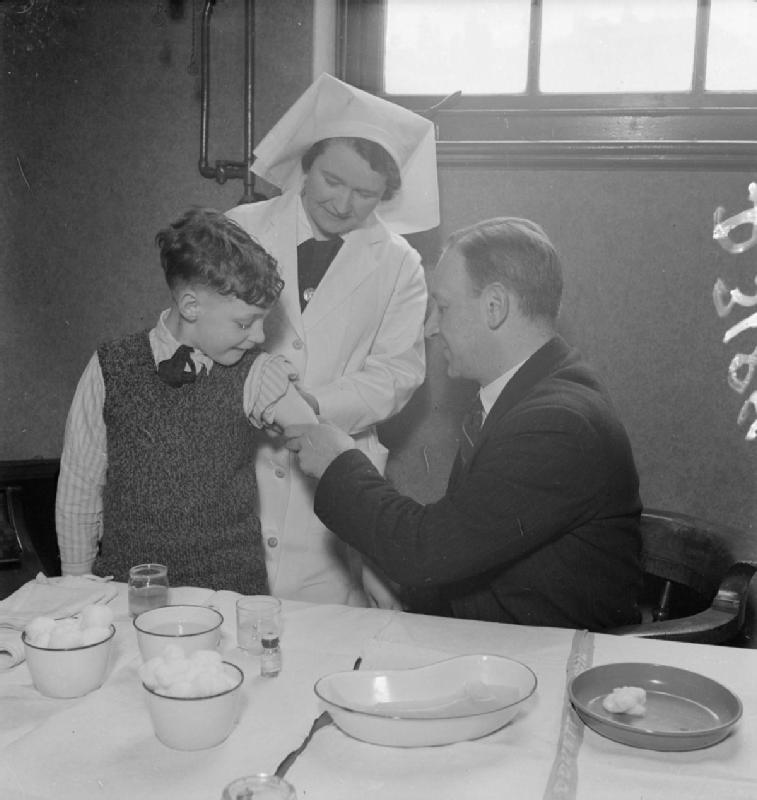
A diphtheria immunisation scheme in London (1941)

In 1885 Joseph P. O'Dwyer introduced the O'Dwyer tube for laryngeal intubation in patients with an obstructed larynx. It soon replaced tracheostomy as the emergency diphtheric intubation method.

In 1888 Emile Roux and Alexandre Yersin showed that a substance (exotoxin) produced by C. diphtheriae caused symptoms of diphtheria in animals.

In 1890 Shibasaburō Kitasato and Emil von Behring immunized guinea pigs with heat-treated diphtheria toxin. They also immunized goats and horses in the same way, and showed that an "antitoxin" made from serum of immunized animals could cure the disease in non-immunized animals. Behring used this antitoxin (now known to consist of antibodies that neutralize the toxin produced by C. diphtheriae) for human trials in 1891, but they were unsuccessful. Successful treatment of human patients with horse-derived antitoxin began in 1894, after production and quantification of antitoxin had been optimized. In 1901, Von Behring won the first Nobel Prize in medicine for his work on diphtheria.

In 1895 H. K. Mulford Company of Philadelphia started production and testing of diphtheria antitoxin in the United States. Park and Biggs described the method for producing serum from horses for use in diphtheria treatment.

In 1897 Paul Ehrlich developed a standardized unit of measure for diphtheria antitoxin. This was the first ever standardization of a biological product, and played an important role in future developmental work on sera and vaccines.

In 1901, 10 of 11 inoculated St. Louis children died from contaminated diphtheria antitoxin. The horse from which the antitoxin was derived died of tetanus. This incident, coupled with a tetanus outbreak in Camden, New Jersey, played an important part in initiating federal regulation of biologic products.

In 1905 Franklin Royer, from Philadelphia's Municipal Hospital, published a paper urging timely treatment for diphtheria and adequate doses of antitoxin.

In 1906 Clemens Pirquet and Béla Schick described serum sickness in children receiving large quantities of horse-derived antitoxin. Schick and Pirquet reported that children treated for diphtheria with very large doses of horse-derived antitoxin frequently developed delayed symptoms, including swelling, fever, rash, and joint pain. It is now understood that these reactions occur because the human immune system recognizes the foreign antibodies in horse serum as antigens, triggering a cascade of immune responses. In the clinical experience of Pirquet and Schick, these reactions were self-limited rather than life-threatening, and children who survived diphtheria were not permanently harmed by the antitoxin treatment.

Between 1910 and 1911 Béla Schick developed the Schick test to detect pre-existing immunity to diphtheria in an exposed person. Only those who had not been exposed to diphtheria were vaccinated. A massive, five-year campaign was coordinated by Dr. Schick. As a part of the campaign, 85 million pieces of literature were distributed by the Metropolitan Life Insurance Company, with an appeal to parents to "Save your child from diphtheria."

In 1914 William H. Park investigated the use of carefully calibrated mixtures of diphtheria toxin and antitoxin to induce active immunity in experimental animals and later humans. Building on earlier antitoxin work, he systematically adjusted the relative concentrations to identify formulations that produced durable protective immunity while minimizing adverse reactions to the toxin–antitoxin complex. This mixture, TAT (for toxin-antitoxin), became the first vaccine against diphtheria.

In 1919, in Dallas, Texas, 10 children were killed and 60 others made seriously ill by toxic antitoxin, which had passed the tests of the New York State Health Department. The manufacturer of the antitoxin, the Mulford Company of Philadelphia, paid damages in every case.

In 1926 Alexander Thomas Glenny increased the effectiveness of diphtheria toxoid (a modified version of the toxin used for vaccination) by treating it with aluminum salts. Vaccination with toxoid was not widely used until the early 1930s. In 1939, Dr. Nora Wattie, who was the Principal Medical Officer (Maternity and Child Welfare) of Glasgow between 1934– 1964, introduced immunisation clinics across Glasgow, and promoted mother and child health education, resulting in virtual eradication of the infection in the city.

Widespread vaccination pushed cases in the United States down from 4.4 per 100,000 inhabitants in 1932 to 2.0 in 1937. In Nazi Germany, where authorities preferred treatment and isolation over vaccination (until about 1939–1941), cases rose over the same period from 6.1 to 9.6 per 100,000 inhabitants.

== List of epidemics ==
=== 17th–19th centuries ===
- In 1613 Spain experienced an epidemic of diphtheria, referred to as El Año de los Garrotillos (The Year of Strangulations).
- In 1705 the Mariana Islands experienced an epidemic of diphtheria and typhus simultaneously, reducing the population to about 5,000 people.
- In 1735 a diphtheria epidemic swept through New England. Then known as "throat distemper," in one New Hampshire town, 32% of children under 10 died. Of the persons known to have acquired diphtheria, nearly 40% died. Noah Webster wrote: "It was literally the plague among children. Many families lost three of four children—many lost all."
- In 1856 Victor Fourgeaud described an epidemic of diphtheria in California.

=== 20th century ===
- In 1925 in Nome, Alaska; the "Great Race of Mercy" to deliver diphtheria antitoxin is now celebrated by the Iditarod Trail Sled Dog Race. During the 1920s, an annual estimate of 100,000 to 200,000 diphtheria cases and 13,000 to 15,000 deaths occurred in the United States.
- Between June 1942 and February 1943, 714 cases of diphtheria were recorded at Sham Shui Po Barracks in Hong Kong, resulting in 112 deaths because the Imperial Japanese Army did not release supplies of anti-diphtheria serum.
- In 1943 diphtheria outbreaks accompanied war and disruption in Europe. The 1 million cases in Europe resulted in 50,000 deaths.
- During 1948 in Kyoto, 68 of 606 children died after diphtheria immunization due to improper manufacture of aluminum phosphate toxoid.
- In 1974 the World Health Organization included DPT vaccine in their Expanded Programme on Immunization for developing countries.
- In 1975 an outbreak of cutaneous diphtheria in Seattle, Washington, was reported.
- After the breakup of the former Soviet Union in 1991, vaccination rates in its constituent countries fell so low that an explosion of diphtheria cases occurred. In 1991, 2,000 cases of diphtheria occurred in the USSR. Between 1991 and 1998, as many as 200,000 cases were reported in the Commonwealth of Independent States, resulting in 5,000 deaths. In 1994, the Russian Federation had 39,703 diphtheria cases. By contrast, in 1990, only 1,211 cases were reported.

=== 21st century ===
- In early May 2010 a case of diphtheria was diagnosed in Port-au-Prince, Haiti, after the devastating 2010 Haiti earthquake. The 15-year-old male patient died while workers searched for antitoxin.
- In 2013 three children died of diphtheria in Hyderabad, India.
- In early June 2015 a case of diphtheria was diagnosed at Vall d'Hebron University Hospital in Barcelona, Spain. The six-year-old child who died of the illness had not been previously vaccinated due to parental opposition to vaccination. It was the first case of diphtheria in the country since 1986 (according to the Spanish daily newspaper El Mundo) or 1998 (according to the WHO).
- In March 2016 a three-year-old girl died of diphtheria in the University Hospital of Antwerp, Belgium.
- In June 2016 a three-year-old, five-year-old, and seven-year-old girl died of diphtheria in Kedah, Malacca, and Sabah, Malaysia.
- In January 2017 more than 300 cases were recorded in Venezuela.
- In 2017 outbreaks occurred in a Rohingya refugee camp in Bangladesh, and amongst children unvaccinated due to the Yemeni Civil War.
- In November and December 2017 an outbreak of diphtheria occurred in Indonesia, with more than 600 cases found and 38 fatalities.
- In November 2019 two cases of diphtheria occurred in the Lothian area of Scotland. Additionally, in November 2019, an unvaccinated eight-year-old boy died of diphtheria in Athens, Greece.
- In July 2022 two cases of diphtheria occurred in northern New South Wales, Australia.
- In October 2022 there was an outbreak of diphtheria at the former Manston airfield, a former Ministry of Defence (MoD) site in Kent, England, which had been converted to an asylum seeker processing centre. The capacity of the processing centre was 1,000 people, although about 3,000 were living at the site, with some accommodated in tents. The Home Office, the government department responsible for asylum seekers, refused to confirm the number of cases.
- In December 2023 there was an outbreak at a primary school in Luton, in the United Kingdom. UK Health Security Agency worked closely with local and national partners to provide vaccination and/or advice where appropriate, to prevent the infection spreading.
- In 2025 in Nigeria, there were 15,273 confirmed diphtheria cases recorded, which included 872 deaths. Over 95 per cent of cases occurred in five states: Kano, Borno, Bauchi, Katsina and Yobe. As of September 2026, Nigeria had reported over 10,000 cases, making it the highest reported number of cases in 2026 so far. This was a persistent problem, due to low vaccination coverage in children.
- In May 2026, an outbreak occurred in the Northern Territory of Australia, with 133 cases reported to the National Notifiable Disease Surveillance System with one death. The outbreak spread into Aboriginal land across the state border in South Australia (6 cases), as well as in the Kimberley region of Western Australia (79), and Queensland (5), in that month. By October 2026, the outbreak had increased to more than 600 cases across the country. SA Health delivered over 4,500 vaccines in the APY Lands in the far north and south-west of the state, where most cases had occurred (22 by October). The federal government had provided support to affected jurisdictions. The outbreak is the biggest since national records began in 1991; the baseline over three years for Australia was 35 cases a year, which had declined to 24 in 2025. Australia stands second to Nigeria in 2026.
- In August 2026 a four-year-old girl (not vaccinated) died of diphtheria in Palermo, Italy. About 10 relatives had tested positive, while the girl's family members were given antibiotic prophylaxis and her siblings were vaccinated after her death. A 4-year-old cousin also tested positive was hospitalized in isolation.

== Deaths of notable people ==
On April 8, 1861, Elisha Graves Otis died from diphtheria at age 49.

In December 1863 Eliza Arabella Garfield, the eldest daughter of James A. Garfield, died from diphtheria at the age of three, right before Christmas.

In 1878 Princess Alice (Queen Victoria's second daughter) and her family became infected with diphtheria; Princess Alice and her four-year-old daughter, Princess Marie, both died. Their deaths caused the Sanitary Journal to warn readers of the “kiss of death” that may have spread the disease through the royal family.

On December 7, 1892, Eleanor Roosevelt's mother, Anna Hall Roosevelt, died of diphtheria at age 29. Five months later, Elliott Roosevelt Jr., Eleanor's younger brother, died of the disease.

On January 7, 1904, Ruth Cleveland died of diphtheria at age 12 in Princeton, New Jersey. She was the eldest daughter of former US President Grover Cleveland and the former First Lady, Frances Folsom.
