= Respiratory syncytial virus G protein =

Major surface glycoprotein G

Identifiers
- Symbol: Glycoprotein_G
- Pfam: PF00802
- InterPro: IPR000925
- SCOP2: 1brv / SCOPe / SUPFAM
Available protein structures:
- Pfam: structures / ECOD
- PDB: RCSB PDB; PDBe; PDBj
- PDBsum: structure summary

Major surface glycoprotein G

Identifiers
- Organism: Human respiratory syncytial virus A (strain A2)
- Symbol: G
- PDB: 5WN9
- UniProt: P03423
Search for
- Structures: Swiss-model
- Domains: InterPro

Respiratory syncytial virus G protein is a glycoprotein produced by respiratory syncytial virus. Some features of the G protein suggest it could be important to respiratory syncytial virus vaccine or antiviral drug target design.
