= Motavizumab =

Monoclonal antibody

Monoclonal antibody
- Type: Whole antibody
- Source: Humanized (from mouse)
- Target: RSV glycoprotein F

Clinical data
- Trade names: Numax
- Routes of administration: Intravenous
- ATC code: J06BD02 (WHO)

Pharmacokinetic data
- Protein binding: None

Identifiers
- CAS Number: 677010-34-3
- DrugBank: DB06310
- ChemSpider: none
- UNII: 50Y163LK8Q
- KEGG: D06621

Chemical and physical data
- Formula: C_{6476}H_{10014}N_{1706}O_{2008}S_{48}
- Molar mass: 145438.16 g·mol^{−1}

Motavizumab (proposed INN, trade name Numax) is a humanized monoclonal antibody. It is being investigated by MedImmune (today a subsidiary of AstraZeneca) for the prevention of respiratory syncytial virus infection in high-risk infants. As of September 2009, it was undergoing Phase II and III clinical trials.

In June 2010, the FDA Antiviral Drugs Advisory Committee declined to endorse MedImmune's request for licensure of motavizumab in a 14 to 3 decision. The members of that panel cited several reasons for the decision, and many were concerned that "we're not looking at a product that has evidence of superiority in terms of efficacy" when compared to the already available monoclonal antibody palivizumab.

In December 2010, AstraZeneca in a stock market statement stated that it would be writing down $445m (£286m) after discontinuing a key development program for motavizumab. The company stated that it would no longer develop motavizumab for the prevention of respiratory syncytial virus (RSV), and as a result was withdrawing its licence application to the US Food and Drug Administration. It added that it would continue to develop motavizumab for other treatments of RSV.
