= Lumicitabine =

Chemical compound

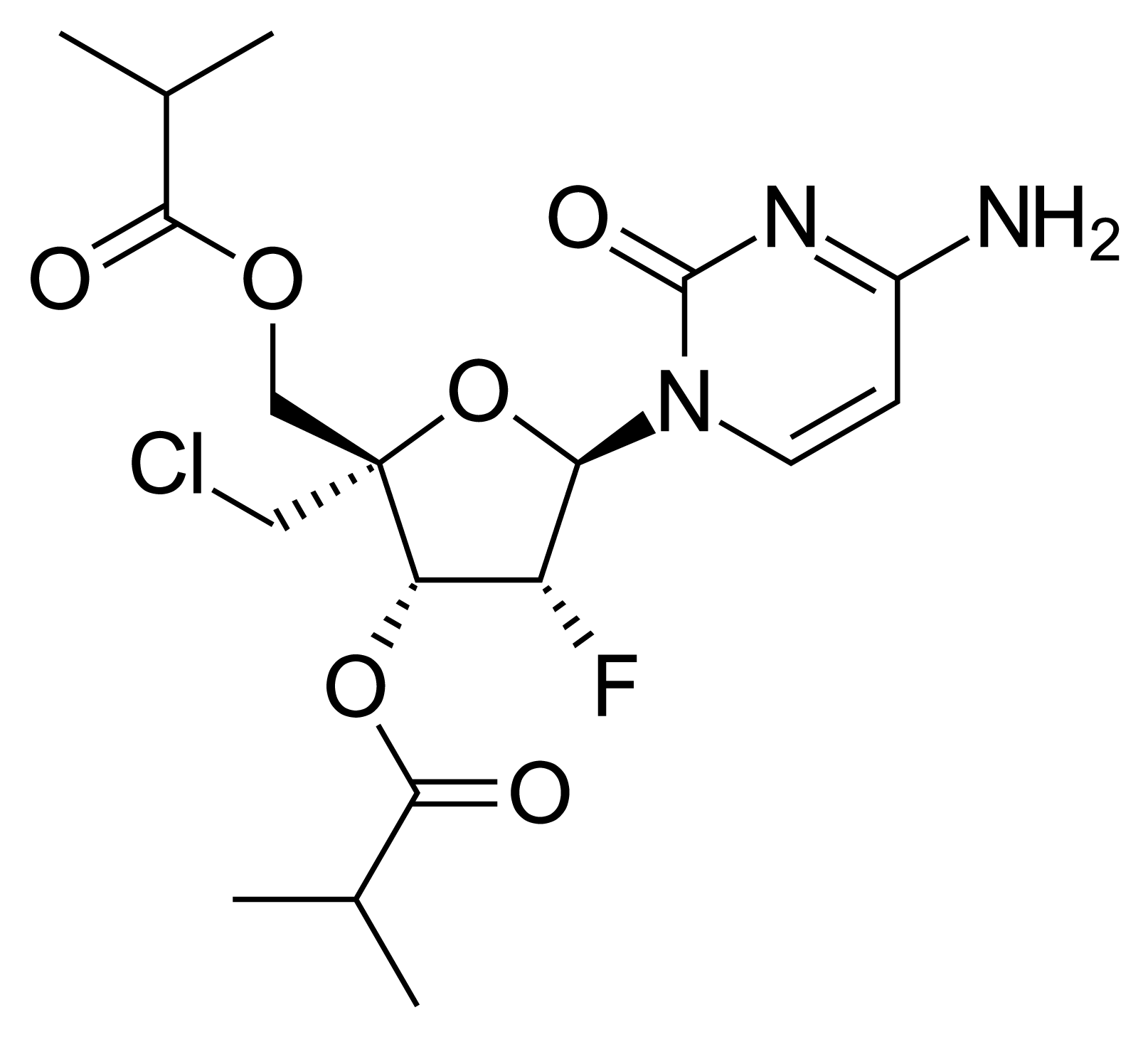

Clinical data
- Trade names: Lumicitabine

Legal status
- Legal status: US: Investigational New Drug

Identifiers
- IUPAC name: [(2R,3R,4R,5R)-5-(4-amino-2-oxopyrimidin-1-yl)-2-(chloromethyl)-4-fluoro-3-(2-methylpropanoyloxy)oxolan-2-yl]methyl 2-methylpropanoate
- CAS Number: 1445385-02-3
- PubChem CID: 89658382
- ChemSpider: 58171803
- UNII: BNW5PQ52G1
- ECHA InfoCard: 100.245.433

Chemical and physical data
- Formula: C_{18}H_{25}ClFN_{3}O_{6}
- Molar mass: 433.86 g·mol^{−1}
- 3D model (JSmol): Interactive image
- SMILES: CC(C)C(=O)OC[C@@]1([C@H]([C@H]([C@@H](O1)N2C=CC(=NC2=O)N)F)OC(=O)C(C)C)CCl
- InChI: InChI=1S/C18H25ClFN3O6/c1-9(2)15(24)27-8-18(7-19)13(28-16(25)10(3)4)12(20)14(29-18)23-6-5-11(21)22-17(23)26/h5-6,9-10,12-14H,7-8H2,1-4H3,(H2,21,22,26)/t12-,13+,14-,18-/m1/s1; Key:MJVKYGMNSQJLIN-KYZVSKTDSA-N

Lumicitabine (ALS-8176) is an antiviral drug which was developed as a treatment for respiratory syncytial virus (RSV) and human metapneumovirus (hMPV). It acts as an RNA polymerase inhibitor. While it showed promise in early clinical trials, poor results in Phase IIb trials led to it being discontinued from development for treatment of RSV. Research continues to determine whether it may be useful for the treatment of diseases caused by other RNA viruses, and it has been found to show activity against Nipah virus.

== See also ==
- 2'-Deoxy-2'-fluorocytidine
- Palivizumab
- Presatovir
- Ziresovir
