= Nirsevimab =

Monoclonal antibody used as vaccine against RSV

Monoclonal antibody
- Type: Whole antibody
- Source: Human
- Target: F protein of RSV

Clinical data
- Trade names: Beyfortus
- Other names: MEDI8897; nirsevimab-alip
- AHFS/Drugs.com: Micromedex Detailed Consumer Information
- License data: US DailyMed: Nirsevimab
- Pregnancy category: AU: B2
- Routes of administration: Intramuscular
- ATC code: J06BD08 (WHO)

Legal status
- Legal status: AU: S4 (Prescription only); CA: ℞-only / Schedule D; UK: POM (Prescription only); US: ℞-only; EU: Rx-only

Identifiers
- CAS Number: 1989556-22-0
- PubChem SID: 384585358
- DrugBank: DB16258
- UNII: VRN8S9CW5V
- KEGG: D11380
- ChEMBL: ChEMBL4297575

Chemical and physical data
- Formula: C_{6494}H_{10060}N_{1708}O_{2050}S_{46}
- Molar mass: 146336.58 g·mol^{−1}

Nirsevimab, sold under the brand name Beyfortus, is a human recombinant monoclonal antibody with activity against respiratory syncytial virus (RSV). It is a respiratory syncytial virus (RSV) F protein‑directed fusion inhibitor that is designed to bind to the fusion protein on the surface of the RSV virus.

The most common side effects are rash, fever and injection site reactions (such as redness, swelling and pain where the injection is given).

It was developed by AstraZeneca and Sanofi. Nirsevimab was approved for medical use in both the European Union and the United Kingdom in November 2022, in Canada in April 2023, and in the United States in July 2023.

== Medical uses ==
In the European Union, nirsevimab is indicated for the prevention of respiratory syncytial virus RSV lower respiratory tract disease in neonates and infants during their first RSV season.

In the United States, nirsevimab is indicated for the prevention of RSV lower respiratory tract disease in neonates and infants born during or entering their first RSV season and children up to 24 months of age who remain vulnerable to severe RSV disease through their second RSV season. Alternatively, in October 2023 the CDC recommended maternal RSVpreF vaccination during pregnancy, though administration of both is not needed in most infants.

== Adverse effects ==
No major hypersensitivity reactions have been reported, and adverse events of grade 3 or higher were only reported in 8% (77 of 968) of participants in the Nirsevimab arm versus 12.5% (60 of 479) in the placebo arm in clinical trial NCT02878330.

== Pharmacology ==
=== Mechanism of action ===
Nirsevimab binds to the prefusion conformation of the RSV fusion (F) protein, i.e. it binds to the site at which the virus would attach to a cell; effectively rendering it useless. It has a modified F_{c} region, extending the half-life of the drug in order for it to last the whole RSV season.

== History ==
The opinion by the Committee for Medicinal Products for Human Use of the European Medicines Agency was based on data from two randomized, double-blind, placebo-controlled multicenter clinical trials that investigated the efficacy and safety of nirsevimab in healthy preterm (premature) and full-term infants entering their first RSV season. The studies demonstrated that nirsevimab prevents lower respiratory tract infection caused by RSV requiring medical attention (such as bronchiolitis and pneumonia) in term and preterm infants during their first RSV season.

The safety of nirsevimab was also evaluated in a phase II/III, randomized, double‑blind, multi-center trial in infants who were born five or more weeks prematurely (less than 35 weeks gestation) at higher risk for severe RSV disease and infants with chronic lung disease of prematurity (i.e. long-term respiratory problems faced by babies born prematurely) or congenital heart disease. The results of this study showed that nirsevimab had a similar safety profile compared to palivizumab (Synagis).

The US Food and Drug Administration (FDA) evaluated the safety and efficacy of nirsevimab based on three trials, two of which were randomized, double-blind, placebo-controlled, multicenter clinical trials (Trials 03, 04 and 05). The key measure of efficacy was the incidence of medically attended RSV lower respiratory tract infection (MA RSV LRTI), evaluated during the 150 days after nirsevimab administration. MA RSV LRTI included all health care provider visits (physician office, urgent care, emergency room visits and hospitalization) for lower respiratory tract disease with worsening clinical severity and a positive RSV test.

Trial 03 included 1,453 preterm infants (born at greater than or equal to 29 weeks of gestational age up to less than 35 weeks of gestation) who were born during or entering their first RSV season. Of the 1,453 preterm infants in the trial, 969 received a single dose of nirsevimab and 484 received placebo. Among infants who were treated with nirsevimab, 25 (2.6%) experienced MA RSV LRTI compared with 46 (9.5%) infants who received placebo. nirsevimab reduced the risk of MA RSV LRTI by approximately 70% relative to placebo.

For Trial 04, the primary analysis group within the trial included 1,490 term and late preterm infants (born at greater than or equal to 35 weeks in gestational age), 994 of whom received a single dose of nirsevimab and 496 of whom received placebo. Among infants who were treated with nirsevimab, 12 (1.2%) experienced MA RSV LRTI compared with 25 (5.0%) infants who received placebo. Nirsevimab reduced the risk of MA RSV LRTI by approximately 75% relative to placebo.

Trial 05, a randomized, double-blind, active (palivizumab)-controlled, multicenter trial, supported the use of nirsevimab in children up to 24 months of age who remain vulnerable to severe RSV disease through their second RSV season. The trial enrolled 925 preterm infants and infants with chronic lung disease of prematurity or congenital heart disease. The safety and pharmacokinetic data from Trial 05 provided evidence for the use of nirsevimab to prevent MA RSV LRTI in this population.

The FDA granted the application for nirsevimab a fast track designation. and granted approval of Beyfortus to AstraZeneca.

== Society and culture ==
=== Legal status ===
In September 2022, the Committee for Medicinal Products for Human Use of the European Medicines Agency recommended to grant a marketing authorization for Beyfortus for the prevention of RSV lower respiratory tract disease in newborns and infants. Beyfortus was reviewed under EMA's accelerated assessment program. The applicant for this medicinal product is AstraZeneca AB. In November 2022, nirsevimab was approved for medical use in the European Union, and the United Kingdom. It was approved in Canada in April 2023, and in the United States in July 2023.

== Research ==
As of 2022, nirsevimab was investigated as an experimental passive immunization agent (different to active immunization agents, such as vaccines) against RSV in the general infant population. The MELODY study is an ongoing, randomized, double-blind, placebo-controlled to evaluate the safety and efficacy of nirsevimab in late preterm and term infants. Initial results were promising, with nirsevimab reducing LRTI (lower respiratory tract infections) by 74.5% compared to placebo in infants born at term or late preterm.

As of April 2023, ongoing trials for nirsevimab were:

- "A Phase 3 Randomized, Double-blind, Placebo-controlled Study to Evaluate the Safety and Efficacy of MEDI8897, a Monoclonal Antibody With an Extended Half-life Against Respiratory Syncytial Virus, in Healthy Late Preterm and Term Infants (MELODY)". ClinicalTrials.gov. 1 September 2022.
- "A Phase 2, Open-label, Uncontrolled, Single-dose Study to Evaluate the Safety and Tolerability, Pharmacokinetics, and Occurrence of Antidrug Antibody for Nirsevimab in Immunocompromised Children ≤ 24 Months of Age". ClinicalTrials.gov. 16 March 2023.
- "A Phase 3, Randomized, Double-blind, Placebo-controlled Study to Evaluate the Safety and Efficacy of Nirsevimab, a Monoclonal Antibody With Extended Half-life Against Respiratory Syncytial Virus, in Healthy Preterm and Term Infants in China". ClinicalTrials.gov. 11 April 2023.
- A trial in the Canadian province of Quebec

== See also ==
Palivizumab
