= Ziresovir =

Medication

Clinical data
- Trade names: Ziresovir

Legal status
- Legal status: US: Investigational New Drug

Identifiers
- IUPAC name: N-[(3-aminooxetan-3-yl)methyl]-2-(1,1-dioxo-3,5-dihydro-2H-1λ6,4-benzothiazepin-4-yl)-6-methylquinazolin-4-amine
- CAS Number: 1422500-60-4
- PubChem CID: 71262247
- ChemSpider: 58810221
- UNII: XCF42D7AG4

Chemical and physical data
- Formula: C_{22}H_{25}N_{5}O_{3}S
- Molar mass: 439.53 g·mol^{−1}
- 3D model (JSmol): Interactive image
- SMILES: CC1=CC2=C(C=C1)N=C(N=C2NCC3(COC3)N)N4CCS(=O)(=O)C5=CC=CC=C5C4
- InChI: InChI=1S/C22H25N5O3S/c1-15-6-7-18-17(10-15)20(24-12-22(23)13-30-14-22)26-21(25-18)27-8-9-31(28,29)19-5-3-2-4-16(19)11-27/h2-7,10H,8-9,11-14,23H2,1H3,(H,24,25,26); Key:GAAICKUTDBZCMT-UHFFFAOYSA-N

Ziresovir (RO-0529, AK0529) is an antiviral drug which was developed as a treatment for respiratory syncytial virus. It acts as a fusion inhibitor, and has shown good results in Phase II and III clinical trials.

== See also ==
- Palivizumab
- Presatovir
- Lumicitabine
