= Immunisation Foundation of Australia =

Australian non-profit

The Immunisation Foundation of Australia (IFA) is a non-profit organisation based in Australia, dedicated to promoting immunisation awareness and advocacy. Established in 2015, the foundation aims to educate the public about the importance of vaccines in preventing disease and protecting public health.

== History ==
The Immunisation Foundation of Australia was founded by the family of Riley Hughes, a young infant who died from whooping cough (pertussis) in 2015. In response to their loss, Riley's parents became advocates for immunisation, launching the foundation to raise awareness about vaccine-preventable diseases and to support community-based advocacy efforts. The foundation's creation coincided with growing public discourse around vaccine hesitancy and the introduction of Australia's "No Jab, No Pay" policy in 2016, which linked certain government benefits to childhood immunisation compliance.

=== Mission and activities ===
The Immunisation Foundation of Australia works to support immunisation efforts and reduce the impact of vaccine-preventable diseases. Its activities include sharing evidence-based information about vaccines and public health such as Whooping Cough Day on 8 November, and providing a platform for families affected by vaccine-preventable illnesses to share their experiences and participate in advocacy., organising awareness events

=== Initiatives and programs ===
The Immunisation Foundation of Australia runs several campaigns to inform the public about vaccine-preventable diseases and encourage immunisation across different life stages. Unite Against RSV raises awareness of respiratory syncytial virus (RSV), which can affect infants and older adults, and supports prevention through maternal immunisation and public education. Prioritise Pneumococcal Protection focuses on pneumococcal vaccination for groups at higher risk, such as young children and older adults, to help prevent illnesses like pneumonia and meningitis. Immunise For Two promotes maternal immunisation during pregnancy to protect both mothers and their babies from diseases including whooping cough, RSV, and influenza. Matter of Vax aims to address vaccine misinformation. Light For Riley, launched in memory of Riley Hughes, highlights the risks of whooping cough and the role of maternal vaccination.
