= Sisunatovir =

Chemical compound

Clinical data
- Other names: PF-07923568, RV521

Identifiers
- IUPAC name: 1'-[[5-(aminomethyl)-1-(4,4,4-trifluorobutyl)benzimidazol-2-yl]methyl]-6'-fluorospiro[cyclopropane-1,3'-indole]-2'-one
- CAS Number: 1903763-82-5
- PubChem CID: 132016492
- UNII: KE63TTO7WK
- KEGG: D12200
- ChEMBL: ChEMBL4297497

Chemical and physical data
- Formula: C_{23}H_{22}F_{4}N_{4}O
- Molar mass: 446.450 g·mol^{−1}
- 3D model (JSmol): Interactive image
- SMILES: C1CC12C3=C(C=C(C=C3)F)N(C2=O)CC4=NC5=C(N4CCCC(F)(F)F)C=CC(=C5)CN
- InChI: InChI=InChI=1S/C23H22F4N4O/c24-15-3-4-16-19(11-15)31(21(32)22(16)7-8-22)13-20-29-17-10-14(12-28)2-5-18(17)30(20)9-1-6-23(25,26)27/h2-5,10-11H,1,6-9,12-13,28H2; Key:JOPCJJSYRPUEDS-UHFFFAOYSA-N

Sisunatovir is an investigational new drug that is being evaluated for the treatment of respiratory syncytial virus (RSV) infections. It functions as an orally administered RSV fusion inhibitor, targeting the RSV-F protein on the viral surface to prevent viral replication. Sisunatovir has been granted Fast Track designation by the U.S. Food and Drug Administration (FDA) due to its potential to address serious RSV infections, which can lead to severe respiratory conditions such as bronchiolitis and pneumonia.
