= Clesrovimab =

Monoclonal antibody

Monoclonal antibody
- Type: Whole antibody
- Source: Human
- Target: Respiratory syncytial virus F protein

Clinical data
- Trade names: Enflonsia
- Other names: MK-1654, clesrovimab-cfor
- AHFS/Drugs.com: Monograph
- MedlinePlus: a625082
- License data: US DailyMed: Clesrovimab
- Routes of administration: Intramuscular
- Drug class: Antiviral
- ATC code: J06BD10 (WHO)

Legal status
- Legal status: CA: ℞-only; US: ℞-only

Identifiers
- CAS Number: 2429913-18-6
- DrugBank: DB18877
- UNII: VJO29R4CP9
- KEGG: D12153

Chemical and physical data
- Formula: C_{6526}H_{10118}N_{1732}O_{2039}S_{40}
- Molar mass: 146747.22 g·mol^{−1}

Clesrovimab, sold under the brand name Enflonsia, is a fully human immunoglobulin G1 kappa monoclonal antibody designed to prevent respiratory syncytial virus (RSV) infection. It is a respiratory syncytial virus (RSV) F protein-directed fusion inhibitor. It was developed by Merck, and was approved for medical use in the United States in June 2025.

Clesrovimab is a fully human immunoglobulin G1 kappa (IgG1κ) neutralizing monoclonal antibody with a triple amino acid substitution in the Fc region which increases binding to the neonatal Fc receptor leading to an extended serum half-life. Clesrovimab provides passive immunity by targeting the RSV outer membrane fusion protein to prevent viral entry into cells.

== Medical uses ==
Clesrovimab is indicated for the prevention of respiratory syncytial virus (RSV) lower respiratory tract disease in neonates and infants who are born during or entering their first RSV season.

== History ==
The safety and efficacy of clesrovimab were supported by two clinical trials (trials 004 and 007). The key measure of efficacy was the incidence of RSV-associated medically-attended lower respiratory infection characterized as cough or difficulty breathing and requiring ≥1 indicator of lower respiratory infection (wheezing, rales/crackles) or severity (chest wall in-drawing/retractions, hypoxemia, tachypnea, dehydration due to respiratory symptoms) through 150 days after dosing. Medically attended includes all healthcare provider visits in settings such as outpatient clinic, clinical study site, emergency department, urgent care center, and/or hospital.

Trials 004 and 007 were randomized, multicenter clinical trials to evaluate the safety, pharmacokinetics and efficacy of clesrovimab in preventing RSV-associated medically-attended lower respiratory infection. Trial 004 was a double-blind, placebo-controlled trial in which 3,614 infants (born at ≥29 to <35 weeks GA or at ≥35 weeks GA) were randomized and received at least one dose of either clesrovimab or placebo. Trial 007 was a partially-blind, palivizumab-controlled trial in which 896 infants who were at increased risk for severe RSV disease (born at ≥29 to ≤35 weeks GA or with chronic lung disease of prematurity or congenital heart disease of any GA) were randomized and received at least one dose of clesrovimab or palivizumab. Trial 004 was a randomized, double-blind placebo-controlled, multi-site trial conducted in 22 countries from the Northern and Southern Hemispheres to evaluate the efficacy of clesrovimab in early and moderate preterm infants (≥29 to <35 weeks gestational age) and late preterm and full-term infants (≥35 weeks gestational age). Among 3,614 participants who received clesrovimab or saline placebo, the median age of infants was 3.1 months (range: 0 to 12 months); 80% were younger than 6 months, 16% were between 6 and 9 months, and 4% were 9 months of age and older; and 51% were male. Of these participants, 18% were gestational age between 29 weeks and 35 weeks, and 82% were gestational age 35 weeks and older. Trial 007 was a randomized, partially-blind, palivizumab-controlled, multi-site trial conducted in 27 countries from the Northern and Southern Hemispheres to evaluate the efficacy of clesrovimab in early (<29 weeks gestational age) or moderate preterm infants (≥29 to ≤35 weeks gestational age), and infants with chronic lung disease of prematurity or congenital heart disease of any gestational age, who are at increased risk for severe RSV disease. Among 896 participants who received clesrovimab or palivizumab, the median age of infants was 2.5 months (range: 0 to 12 months); 89% were younger than 6 months, 9% were between 6 and 9 months, and 2% were 9 months of age and older; and 50% were male. Of these participants, 28% had chronic lung disease, 11% had congenital heart disease, 6% were gestational age younger than 29 weeks with neither chronic lung disease nor congenital heart disease and 55% were gestational age 29 weeks and older with neither chronic lung disease nor congenital heart disease.

== Society and culture ==
=== Legal status ===
Clesrovimab was approved for medical use in the United States in June 2025.

In September 2025, the Committee for Medicinal Products for Human Use of the European Medicines Agency adopted a positive opinion, recommending the granting of a marketing authorization for the medicinal product Enflonsia, intended for the prevention of respiratory syncytial virus (RSV) lower respiratory tract disease in neonates and infants during their first RSV season. The applicant for this medicinal product is Merck Sharp & Dohme B.V.

=== Names ===
Clesrovimab is the international nonproprietary name.

Clesrovimab is sold under the brand name Enflonsia.
