= Presatovir =

Chemical compound

Clinical data
- Trade names: Presatovir

Legal status
- Legal status: US: Investigational New Drug

Identifiers
- IUPAC name: N-[2-[(2S)-2-[5-[(3S)-3-aminopyrrolidin-1-yl]-6-methylpyrazolo[1,5-a]pyrimidin-2-yl]piperidine-1-carbonyl]-4-chlorophenyl]methanesulfonamide
- CAS Number: 1353625-73-6
- PubChem CID: 58029842
- UNII: 9628AJ27JA

Chemical and physical data
- Formula: C_{24}H_{30}ClN_{7}O_{3}S
- Molar mass: 532.06 g·mol^{−1}
- 3D model (JSmol): Interactive image
- SMILES: CC1=CN2C(=CC(=N2)[C@@H]3CCCCN3C(=O)C4=C(C=CC(=C4)Cl)NS(=O)(=O)C)N=C1N5CC[C@@H](C5)N
- InChI: InChI=1S/C24H30ClN7O3S/c1-15-13-32-22(27-23(15)30-10-8-17(26)14-30)12-20(28-32)21-5-3-4-9-31(21)24(33)18-11-16(25)6-7-19(18)29-36(2,34)35/h6-7,11-13,17,21,29H,3-5,8-10,14,26H2,1-2H3/t17-,21-/m0/s1; Key:GOFXWTVKPWJNGD-UWJYYQICSA-N

Presatovir (GS-5806) is an antiviral drug which was developed as a treatment for respiratory syncytial virus. It acts as a fusion inhibitor, and has shown promising results in Phase II clinical trials.

== See also ==
- Palivizumab
- Lumicitabine
- Ziresovir
