= Vaccine-associated enhanced respiratory disease =

Serious adverse event of vaccine candidates

Vaccine-associated enhanced respiratory disease (VAERD), or simply enhanced respiratory disease (ERD), is an adverse event where an exacerbated course of respiratory disease occurs with higher incidence in the vaccinated population than in the control group. It is a barrier against vaccine development that can lead to its failure.

Immunologically, VAERD is characterized with an exaggerated Th2 response and eosinophilic pulmonary infiltrations. It may result from antibody-mediated complement activation followed by weak neutralization.

Historical instances of the phenomenon were seen in vaccine candidates for respiratory syncytial virus (RSV), SARS-CoV, Middle East Respiratory Syndrome (MERS), and some influenza strains. Thus, COVID-19 vaccine clinical research involved monitoring for VAERD because the vaccine target, SARS-CoV-2, belongs to the same viral subfamily as SARS-CoV and MERS. The effect was not shown in phase III clinical trials for Tozinameran or for the Moderna vaccine.

== See also ==
Antibody-dependent enhancement
