= Respiratory syncytial virus vaccine =

Vaccine against respiratory syncytial virus

A respiratory syncytial virus vaccine, or RSV vaccine, is a vaccine that protects against respiratory syncytial virus. RSV affects an estimated 64 million people and causes 160,000 deaths worldwide each year.

The RSV vaccines Arexvy (GSK), Abrysvo (Pfizer), and Mresvia (Moderna) are approved for medical use in the United States. Arexvy is approved for medical use in the United States, in the European Union, and in Canada for people aged 60 years of age and older. Arexvy is approved in the US for people aged 50–59 years of age who are at increased risk. In the United States, the Centers for Disease Control and Prevention (CDC) recommends a single dose of an RSV vaccine for all adults aged 75 years and older and for adults aged 50–74 years who are at increased risk of severe RSV illness. RSV vaccination is not currently recommended annually; people who have already received an RSV vaccine are not recommended to receive another dose at this time.

A 2013 study led to the 2023 approval of RSV vaccines. Work on RSV vaccines also supported the rapid development of COVID-19 vaccines. It is on the World Health Organization's List of Essential Medicines.

== Medical uses ==
Respiratory syncytial virus vaccine is indicated for active immunization for the prevention of lower respiratory tract disease caused by respiratory syncytial virus in people 60 years of age and older.

Abrysvo is indicated for active immunization for the prevention of lower respiratory tract disease caused by RSV in people 60 years of age and older, high-risk individuals aged 18 through 59 and pregnant individuals at 32 through 36 weeks gestational age to prevent severe disease in their infants from birth through six months of age. Abrysvo is approved for use in pregnant women at 24 through 36 weeks and older adults in the European Union. and between 28 through 36 weeks and older adults in the United Kingdom.

Infant-specific issues include the immature infant immune system and the presence of maternal antibodies, which make infantile immunization difficult.

== History ==
=== Development ===
Attempts to develop an RSV vaccine began in the 1960s with an unsuccessful inactivated vaccine developed by exposing the RSV virus to formalin (formalin-inactivated RSV (FI-RSV)). This early vaccine induced vaccine-associated enhanced respiratory disease (VAERD), in which children who had not previously been exposed to RSV and were vaccinated would develop severe RSV disease if exposed to the virus itself, including fever, wheezing, and bronchopneumonia. Some eighty percent of such children (vs. 5% of virus-exposed controls) were hospitalized, and two children died of lethal lung inflammation during the first natural RSV infection after vaccination of RSV-naive infants. This deadly vaccine failure slowed vaccine development for many years.

A 1998 paper reported that research had advanced greatly over the previous ten years. A 2019 paper similarly claimed that research toward developing a vaccine had advanced greatly over the prior 10 years, with more than 30 candidates in some stage of development. The same study predicted that a vaccine would be available within ten years. Candidates included particle-based vaccines, attenuated vaccines, mRNA vaccines, protein subunit vaccines, and vector-based vaccines.

A 2013 study detailed the crystal structure of the RSV fusion (F) protein and how its stability could be improved. This provided the basis for finding the most effective F protein constructs, which are used in RSV vaccines. To develop its vaccine, Pfizer engineered 400 different F protein constructs to identify the most immunogenic, and constructed a bivalent RSV prefusion F investigational vaccine.

In February 2023, results of a phase III study of around 25,000 participants age 60+ were published. One dose of the Arexvy vaccine provided 94% efficacy against severe RSV pneumonia and 72% efficacy against RSV acute respiratory infection. An advisory panel to the FDA recommended approval of the vaccine in February 2023.

In April 2023, the Committee for Medicinal Products for Human Use of the European Medicines Agency (EMA) recommended to grant a marketing authorization for Arexvy for the prevention of RSV lower respiratory tract disease in people 60 years of age or older after review under the EMA's accelerated assessment program.

In May 2023, Arexvy was approved for people aged 60 years of age and older, making it the first FDA-approved RSV vaccine.

In May 2023, the FDA's expert panel unanimously recommended Abrysvo for approval in pregnant women. The panel was split on the safety of the vaccine in respect of preterm births.

In June 2023, Arexvy was authorized for medical use in the European Union.

The mRNA vaccine Mresvia was approved for medical use in the United States in May 2024.

In June 2024, the FDA approved Arexvy for use in people aged 50 to 59 years of age who are at an increased risk of RSV-caused lower respiratory tract disease. The approval is based on data from a phase III study (NCT05590403), which showed that immune responses were non-inferior in people aged 50–59 years of age at increased risk for RSV disease compared to people aged 60 years of age and older.

In October 2024, the FDA approved Abrysvo for the prevention of lower respiratory tract disease caused by respiratory syncytial virus (RSV) in individuals 18 through 59 years of age who are at increased risk for lower respiratory tract disease caused by RSV. Since 2023, Abrysvo has been approved for the prevention of lower respiratory tract disease caused by RSV in individuals 60 years of age and older and for use in pregnant individuals at 32 through 36 weeks gestational age for the prevention of lower respiratory tract disease and severe lower respiratory tract disease caused by RSV in infants from birth through six months of age. Abrysvo is manufactured by Pfizer.

Mresvia was authorized for medical use in the European Union in August 2024.

=== Clinical trials ===
Several phase III programs for RSV vaccines in older adults reached conclusions during 2023 and 2024. The trials of GSK's Arexvy, Pfizer's Abrysvo and Moderna's Mresvia supported approvals in the United States in May 2023, May 2023 and May 2024, respectively. Johnson & Johnson discontinued its phase III EVERGREEN adult RSV vaccine trial and exited the program in March 2023. Bavarian Nordic discontinued its RSV vaccine program in July 2023 after its phase III candidate failed to meet one of its co-primary efficacy endpoints.

==== xGSK ====
Respiratory Syncytial Virus Vaccine, Adjuvanted
Vaccine description
- Target: RSVPreF3 antigen
- Vaccine type: Protein subunit

Clinical data
- Trade names: Arexvy
- Other names: GSK3844766A, respiratory syncytial virus vaccine, adjuvanted
- AHFS/Drugs.com: RSV Vaccine Monograph; RSV Vaccine MRNA Monograph; Micromedex Detailed Consumer Information; Multum Consumer Information
- License data: US DailyMed: Respiratory syncytial vaccine
- Pregnancy category: AU: B2
- Routes of administration: Intramuscular
- ATC code: J07BX05 (WHO)

Legal status
- Legal status: AU: S4 (Prescription only); CA: ℞-only / Schedule D; UK: POM (Prescription only); US: ℞-only; EU: Rx-only

Identifiers
- KEGG: D12607

In November 2020, GSK's vaccine, GSK3888550A, entered phase III trials for pregnant women. The vaccine's antigen is a stabilized version of the RSV F protein, which was developed using structure-based vaccine design. This trial was terminated in February 2022, on the advice of an external Data Monitoring Committee, because of an excess of premature births in the trial arm.

The FDA analyzed data from an ongoing, randomized, placebo-controlled clinical study conducted in the US and internationally in individuals 60 years of age and older. The main clinical study was designed to assess the safety and effectiveness of a single dose administered to individuals 60 years of age and older. Participants agreed to remain in the study through three RSV seasons to assess the duration of effectiveness and the safety and effectiveness of repeat vaccination. Data from the first RSV season of the study were available for the FDA's analysis. In this study, approximately 12,500 participants received vaccine and 12,500 participants received a placebo. The vaccine reduced the risk of developing RSV-associated lower respiratory tract disease by 82.6% and reduced the risk of developing severe RSV-associated lower respiratory tract disease by 94.1%. The FDA granted the application priority review designation and granted approval of Arexvy to GlaxoSmithKline Biologicals.

In October 2022, GSK started a phase III, observer-blind, randomized, placebo-controlled study to evaluate the safety of the vaccine in people 50–59 years of age compared to people 60 years of age and older. The vaccine elicited an immune response in people aged 50 to 59 years of age at increased risk for RSV disease due to select underlying medical conditions that was non-inferior to that observed in people aged 60 years of age and older, meeting the trial's primary co-endpoint.

==== Pfizer ====
Respiratory syncytial virus vaccine
Vaccine description
- Target: RSVPreF3 antigen
- Vaccine type: Protein subunit

Clinical data
- Trade names: Abrysvo
- AHFS/Drugs.com: RSV Vaccine Monograph; RSV Vaccine MRNA Monograph; Micromedex Detailed Consumer Information; Multum Consumer Information
- License data: US DailyMed: Respiratory syncytial vaccine
- Pregnancy category: AU: A
- Routes of administration: Intramuscular
- ATC code: J07BX05 (WHO)

Legal status
- Legal status: AU: S4 (Prescription only); CA: ℞-only; UK: POM (Prescription only); US: ℞-only; EU: Rx-only

Identifiers
- KEGG: D12607

RSVpreF (Abrysvo) is a bivalent recombinant protein subunit vaccine which consists of equal amounts of stabilized prefusion F antigens from the two major RSV subgroups: RSV A and RSV B.

In April 2023, Pfizer published their interim results of their phase III study of a RSV vaccine for adults age 60 and older in over 34,000 participants. One dose of the vaccine was 67% efficacious in preventing infections with at least two symptoms and it was 86% effective against more severe disease, in people with three related symptoms. The vaccine's protection was consistent across different subgroups, and was 62% effective in preventing acute respiratory illness caused by RSV infection.

In April 2023, Pfizer published interim results of their double blind phase III study in about 3,600 pregnant women, with another 3,600 women receiving a placebo. One dose of the vaccine provided 81% efficacy in preventing severe infection within three months after birth and 69% in six months after birth. The most common side effects were pain at the injection site, headache, muscle pain and nausea.

In a subgroup of pregnant individuals who were 32 through 36 weeks gestational age, of whom about 1,500 received Abrysvo and 1,500 received placebo, Abrysvo reduced the risk of lower respiratory tract disease by 34.7%, and reduced the risk of severe lower respiratory tract disease by 91.1% within 90 days after birth when compared to placebo. Within 180 days after birth, Abrysvo reduced the risk of lower respiratory tract disease by 57.3% and by 76.5% for severe lower respiratory tract disease, when compared to placebo. In a second study, about 100 pregnant individuals received Abrysvo and approximately 100 pregnant women received placebo.

==== Moderna ====
Respiratory syncytial virus vaccine
Clinical data
- Trade names: Mresvia
- AHFS/Drugs.com: RSV Vaccine Monograph; RSV Vaccine MRNA Monograph; Micromedex Detailed Consumer Information; Multum Consumer Information
- License data: US DailyMed: Respiratory syncytial vaccine
- Pregnancy category: AU: B2
- Routes of administration: Intramuscular
- ATC code: J07BX05 (WHO)

Legal status
- Legal status: AU: S4 (Prescription only); CA: ℞-only; US: ℞-only; EU: Rx-only

Identifiers
- KEGG: D12607

Mresvia is an mRNA vaccine that was studied in clinical trial NCT05127434. It was approved for medical use in the United States in May 2024. It protects against lower respiratory tract disease caused by RSV in adults aged 60 years and older. It is also used in adults aged 18 to 59 years who are at increased risk for lower respiratory tract disease caused by RSV.

During studies, this vaccine is under the name of mRNA-1345 vaccine. It is a vaccine that uses messenger RNA technology. It is a lipid nanoparticle that contain mRNA which encodes the RSV F-protein stabilized in the prefusion conformation.

===== Phase 2/3 trial =====
The phase 2/3 trial of 2024 evaluated the humoral immunogenicity of the mRNA-1345 vaccine in adults older than 60 years old. A total of approximatively 35,000 participants were randomized, and an immunogenicity subset (mRNA-1345: n=1515; placebo: n=333) was analysed.

Results showed that at 29 days after vaccination, mRNA-1345 induced strong increases in neutralizing antibodies (nAbs) against both RSV-A and RSV-B, with 8.4-fold and 5.1-fold rises, respectively, compared with baseline. Seroresponse rates (≥4-fold increase) were 74.2% for RSV-A and 56.5% for RSV-B, greatly exceeding placebo responses. Binding antibodies (bAbs) to the preF antigen also increased, showing a 7.7-fold increase after vaccination. mRNA-1345 vaccine enhanced an antibody response across all demographic and risk groups.

Overall, mRNA-1345 vaccine produced robust and rapid humoral immune responses across diverse high-risk populations. So, it provides protection against RSV in older persons who are predisposed to severe disease.

Given natural infection with RSV does not confer lifelong protection, revaccination may be required after primary vaccination. The need and timing for revaccination with RSV vaccines is being evaluated in studies.

===== Revaccination trial =====
This study evaluated if revaccination with the mRNA-1345 vaccine after 12 months is safe and immunogenic in adults older than 50 years old.

In this phase 3 trial, there were 543 participants and it included 525 patients that were included in the immunogenicity analyses. Those participants received 50 μg booster dose of mRNA-1345 12 months later.

Revaccination was safe and well tolerated, with mostly mild, short-lasting local and systemic reactions and no vaccine-related serious adverse events. At Day 29, neutralizing antibody responses to RSV-A and RSV-B met noninferiority criteria compared with the primary dose, with geometric mean titer ratios of 1.08 and 0.91, respectively. Antibody levels increased substantially after revaccination and remained above baseline through 12 months. Seroresponse rates were 77.5% for RSV-A and 47.5% for RSV-B. Immunogenicity was consistent across demographic subgroups.

Overall, mRNA-1345 revaccination was safe and well tolerated. The immunogenic response was comparable to the primary dose and it was effective across all subgroups.

These findings support the potential use of annual revaccination for adults ≥50 years, especially those at higher risk for severe RSV.

== Society and culture ==
=== Legal status ===
In June 2024, the Committee for Medicinal Products for Human Use of the European Medicines Agency adopted a positive opinion, recommending the granting of a marketing authorization for the medicinal product Mresvia, intended for the prevention of lower respiratory tract disease caused by respiratory syncytial virus. The applicant for this medicinal product is Moderna Biotech Spain S.L. Mresvia was approved for medical use in the European Union in August 2024.
