= 2'-Deoxy-2'-fluorocytidine =

Legal status
- Legal status: US: Investigational New Drug

Identifiers
- IUPAC name: 4-amino-1-[(2R,3R,4R,5R)-3-fluoro-4-hydroxy-5-(hydroxymethyl)oxolan-2-yl]pyrimidin-2-one
- CAS Number: 10212-20-1
- PubChem CID: 101507
- ChemSpider: 91721
- UNII: LCY080JPY9
- ChEBI: CHEBI:230019
- ChEMBL: ChEMBL374528
- CompTox Dashboard (EPA): DTXSID20907103

Chemical and physical data
- Formula: C_{9}H_{12}FN_{3}O_{4}
- Molar mass: 245.210 g·mol^{−1}
- 3D model (JSmol): Interactive image
- SMILES: C1=CN(C(=O)N=C1N)[C@H]2[C@@H]([C@@H]([C@H](O2)CO)O)F
- InChI: InChI=1S/C9H12FN3O4/c10-6-7(15)4(3-14)17-8(6)13-2-1-5(11)12-9(13)16/h1-2,4,6-8,14-15H,3H2,(H2,11,12,16)/t4-,6-,7-,8-/m1/s1; Key:NVZFZMCNALTPBY-XVFCMESISA-N

2'-Deoxy-2'-fluorocytidine is a nucleoside derivative developed in the 1960s, which has antiviral properties against many different kinds of viral diseases. It is closely related to several other antiviral drugs such as azvudine and lumicitabine, as well as the anti-cancer drug gemcitabine. 2'-Deoxy-2'-fluorocytidine has never been developed for medical use due to its comparatively harsh side effect profile, despite its broad spectrum antiviral properties, but has attracted renewed attention in recent years as a potential treatment for Crimean–Congo hemorrhagic fever (CCHF), a tick-borne hemorrhagic fever from the bunyavirus family. CCHF is highly lethal with a case fatality rate upwards of 30%, and no vaccine is currently available though some are in development. Some existing drugs such as ribavirin and favipiravir show activity against CCHF, but neither is very effective and there are no approved treatments for human use. There is therefore a pressing need for improved treatments for CCHF, and 2'-deoxy-2'-fluorocytidine was one of the most effective agents identified in vitro and in animal studies. It is currently in pre-clinical development with a view to potential human clinical trials.
