= Neutralizing antibody =

Type of antibody

Neutralizing antibodies
- Standard antibody representation

Properties
- Protein Type: Immunoglobin
- Function: Neutralization of antigens
- Production: B cells

A neutralizing antibody (NAb) is an antibody that defends a cell from a pathogen or infectious particle by neutralizing any effect it has biologically. Neutralization renders the particle no longer infectious or pathogenic. Neutralizing antibodies are part of the humoral response of the adaptive immune system against viruses, bacteria and microbial toxin. By binding specifically to surface structures (antigens) on an infectious particle, neutralizing antibodies prevent the particle from interacting with its host cells it might infect and destroy.

== Mechanism ==
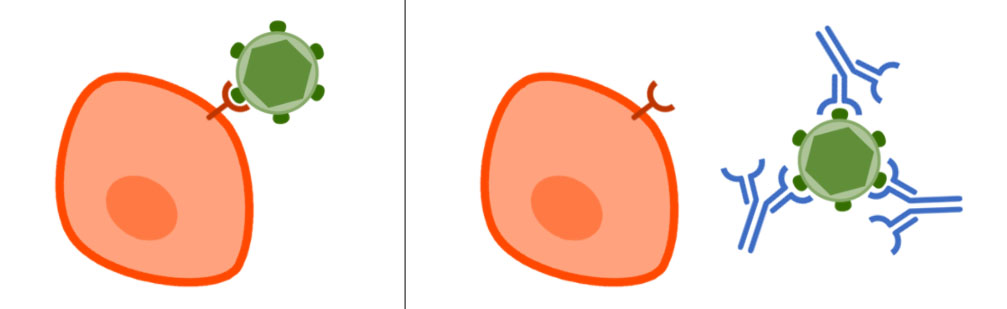
Covering a pathogen's antigen in antibodies make the pathogen less infectious and less pathogenic. In the image on the right, virus entry to the cell is prevented by neutralizing antibodies binding to the virus.

In order to enter cells, pathogens, such as circulating viral particles or extracellular bacteria, use molecules on their surfaces to interact with the cell surface receptors of their target cell which allows them to enter the cell and start their replication cycle. Neutralizing antibodies can inhibit infectivity by binding to the pathogen and blocking the molecules needed for cell entry. This can be due to the antibodies statically interfering with the pathogens, or toxins attaching to host cell receptors. In case of a viral infection, NAbs can bind to glycoproteins of enveloped viruses or capsid proteins of non-enveloped viruses. Furthermore, neutralizing antibodies can act by preventing particles from undergoing structural changes often needed for successful cell entry. For example, neutralizing antibodies can prevent conformational changes of viral proteins that mediate the membrane fusion needed for entry into the host cell. In some cases, the virus is unable to infect even after the antibody dissociates. The pathogen-antibody complex is eventually taken up and degraded by macrophages.

Neutralizing antibodies are also important in neutralizing the toxic effects of bacterial toxins. An example of a neutralizing antibody is diphtheria antitoxin, which can neutralize the biological effects of diphtheria toxin. Neutralizing antibodies are not effective against extracellular bacteria, as the binding of antibodies does not prevent bacteria from replicating. Here, the immune system uses other functions of antibodies, like opsonisation and complement activation, to kill the bacteria.

=== Difference between neutralizing antibodies and binding antibodies ===
Not all antibodies that bind to a pathogenic particle are neutralizing. Non-neutralizing antibodies, or binding antibodies, bind specifically to the pathogen, but do not interfere with their infectivity. That might be because they do not bind to the right region. Non-neutralizing antibodies can be important to flag the particle for immune cells, signaling that it has been targeted, after which the particle is processed and consequently destroyed by recruited immune cells. Neutralizing antibodies on the other hand can neutralize the biological effects of the antigen without a need for immune cells. In some cases, non-neutralizing antibodies, or an insufficient amount of neutralizing antibodies binding to viral particles, can be utilized by some species of virus to facilitate uptake into their host cells. This mechanism is known as antibody-dependent enhancement. It has been observed for Dengue virus and Zika virus.

== Production ==
Antibodies are produced and secreted by B cells. When B cells are produced in the bone marrow, the genes that encode the antibodies undergo random genetic recombination (V(D)J recombination), which results in every mature B cell producing antibodies that differ in their amino acid sequence in the antigen-binding region. Therefore, every B cell produces antibodies that bind specifically to different antigens. A strong diversity in the antibody repertoire allows the immune system to recognize a plethora of pathogens which can come in all different forms and sizes. During an infection only antibodies that bind to the pathogenic antigen with high affinity are produced. This is achieved by clonal selection of a single B cell clone: B cells are recruited to the site of infection by sensing interferons that are released by the infected cells as part of the innate immune response. B cells display B-cell receptors on their cell surface, which is just the antibody anchored to the cell membrane. When the B-cell receptor binds to its cognate antigen with high affinity, an intracellular signalling cascade is triggered. In addition to binding to an antigen, B cells need to be stimulated by cytokines produced by T helper cells as part of the cellular response of the immune system against the pathogen. Once a B cell is fully activated, it rapidly proliferates and differentiates into plasma cells. Plasma cells then secrete the antigen-specific antibody in large quantities. After a first encounter of the antigen by vaccination or natural infection, immunological memory allows for a more rapid production of neutralizing antibodies following the next exposure to the virus.

== Virus evasion of neutralizing antibodies ==
Viruses use a variety of mechanisms to evade neutralizing antibodies. Viral genomes mutate at a high rate. Mutations that allow viruses to evade a neutralizing antibody will be selected for, and hence prevail. Conversely, antibodies also simultaneously evolve by affinity maturation during the course of an immune response, thereby improving recognition of viral particles. Conserved parts of viral proteins that play a central role in viral function are less likely to evolve over time, and therefore are more vulnerable to antibody binding. However, viruses have evolved certain mechanisms to hinder steric access of an antibody to these regions, making binding difficult. Viruses with a low density of surface structural proteins are more difficult for antibodies to bind to. Some viral glycoproteins are heavily glycosylated by N- and O- linked glycans, creating a so-called glycan shield, which may decrease antibody binding affinity and facilitate evasion of neutralizing antibodies. HIV-1, the cause of human AIDS, uses both of these mechanisms.

== Medical uses of neutralizing antibodies ==
Neutralizing antibodies are used for passive immunisation, and can be used for patients even if they do not have a healthy immune system. In the early 20th century, infected patients were injected with antiserum, which is the blood serum of a previously infected and recovered patient containing polyclonal antibodies against the infectious agent. This showed that antibodies could be used as an effective treatment for viral infections and toxins. Antiserum is a very crude therapy, because antibodies in the plasma are not purified or standardized and the blood plasma could be rejected by the donor. As it relies on the donation from recovered patients it cannot be easily scaled up. However, serum therapy is today still used as the first line of defence during an outbreak as it can relatively quickly obtained. Serum therapy was shown to reduce mortality in patients during the 2009 swine flu pandemic and the Western African Ebola virus epidemic. It is also being tested as possible treatment for COVID-19. Immunoglobulin therapy, which uses a mixture of antibodies obtained from healthy people, is given to immunodeficient or immunosuppressed patients to fight off infections.

For a more specific and robust treatment, purified polyclonal or monoclonal antibodies (mAb) can be used. Polyclonal antibodies are collection of antibodies that target the same pathogen but bind to different epitopes. Polyclonal antibodies are obtained from human donors or animals that have been exposed to the antigen. The antigen injected into the animal donors can be designed in such a way to preferably produce neutralizing antibodies. Polyclonal antibodies have been used as treatment for cytomegalovirus (CMV), hepatitis b virus (HBV), rabies virus, measles virus, and respiratory syncytial virus (RSV). Diphtheria antitoxin contains polyclonal antibodies against the diphtheria toxin. By treating with antibodies binding multiple epitopes, the treatment is still effective even if the virus mutates and one of the epitopes changes in structure. However, because of the nature of the production, treatment with polyclonal antibodies has batch to batch variation and low antibody titers. Monoclonal antibodies, on the other hand, all bind the same epitope with high specificity. They can be produced with the Hybridoma technology, which allows the production of mAbs in large quantities. mAbs against infections stop working when virus mutates the epitope that is targeted by the mAbs or multiple strain are circulating. Example of drugs that use monoclonal antibodies include ZMapp against Ebola and Palivizumab against RSV. Many mABs against other infections are in clinical trials.

Neutralizing antibodies also play a role in active immunisation by vaccination. By understanding the binding sites and structure of neutralizing antibodies in a natural immune response a vaccine can be rationally designed such that it stimulates the immune system to produce neutralizing antibodies and not binding antibodies. Introducing a weakened form of a virus through vaccination allows for the production of neutralizing antibodies by B cells. After a second exposure, the neutralizing antibody response is more rapid due to the existence of memory B cells that produce antibodies specific to the virus. An effective vaccine induces the production of antibodies that are able to neutralize the majority of variants of a virus, although virus mutation resulting in antibody evasion may require vaccines to be updated in response. Some viruses evolve faster than others, which can require the need for vaccines to be updated in response. A well known example is the vaccine for the influenza virus, which must be updated annually to account for the recent circulating strains of the virus.

Neutralizing antibodies may also assist the treatment of multiple sclerosis. Although this type of antibody has the ability to fight retroviral infections, in some cases it attacks pharmaceuticals administered to the body which would otherwise treat multiple sclerosis. Recombinant protein drugs, especially those derived from animals, are commonly targeted by neutralizing antibodies. A few examples are Rebif, Betaseron and Avonex.

=== Methods for detection and quantification of neutralizing antibodies ===
Neutralization assays are capable of being performed and measured in different ways, including the use of techniques such as plaque reduction (which compares counts of virus plaques in control wells with those in inoculated cultures), microneutralization (which is performed in microtiter plates filled with small amounts of sera), and colorimetric assays (which depend on biomarkers indicating metabolic inhibition of the virus).

== Broadly neutralizing antibodies ==
Most of the neutralizing antibodies produced by the immune system are very specific for a single virus strain due to affinity maturation by B cells. Some pathogens with high genetic variability, such as HIV, constantly change their surface structure such that neutralizing antibodies with high specificity to the old strain can no longer bind to the new virus strain. This immune evasion strategy prevents the immune system from developing immunological memory against the pathogen. Broadly neutralizing antibodies (bNAbs), on the other hand, have the special ability to bind and neutralize multiple strains of a virus species. They too arise from affinity maturation (MA), but the randomness in antibody generation and MA has lined up in a way that MA ends up increasing the affinity against a conserved epitope.

bNAbs have been initially found in HIV patients. However, they are quite rare: an in situ screening study showed that only 1% of all patients develop bNAbs against HIV. bNABs can neutralize a wide range of virus strains by binding to conserved regions of the virus surface proteins that are unable to mutate because they are functionally essential for the virus replication. Most binding sites of bNAbs against HIV are on HIV's exposed surface antigen, the envelope (Env) protein (a trimer composed of gp120 and gp41 subunits). These site include the CD4 binding site or the gp41-gp120 interface. Los Alamos National Laboratory's HIV Databases is a comprehensive resource that has a wealth of information about HIV sequences, bNAbs, and more.

Additionally, bNAbs have been found for other viruses including influenza, hepatitis C, dengue and West Nile virus.

=== Research ===
Preliminary research is conducted to identify and test bNAbs against HIV-1. There is research on using them directly as forms of passive immunity and on potential ways to generate them reliably in any person.

One ideal in the field of vaccination is to reliably replicate the generation of bNAbs: doing so would produce a vaccine more resistant to immune escape. The sequences of known bnAbs are used to reconstruct the processes that lead to their generation, which in turn guides the design of antigens. No antigen that triggers bNAb production in animal models or humans is known as of 2018.

== Engineered neutralizing antibodies ==
Most natural antibodies are symmetrical, with two tips of the "Y" shape binding the same epitope. By combining the tips of different antibodies, a bi-specific antibody (BsAb) that binds both molecules and "glues" them together can be made. One example of such an antibody binds both HIV-1 Env and its CD4 receptor. This seems to allow it to have enhanced ability to neutralise HIV-1 as well as an enhanced neutralisation breadth. It is theorized that this BsAb first binds to the CD4 on the surface of target cells, putting it in a good position to bind to and stop any attacking Env.

== See also ==
- Blocking antibody
- Humoral immunity
