= Respiratory syncytial virus F protein =

Fusion glycoprotein F0

Identifiers
- Organism: Human respiratory syncytial virus B (strain B1)
- Symbol: F
- Entrez: 1489825
- Orthologs: NCBI: entry; OMA: entry
- RefSeq (mRNA): NC_001781.1
- RefSeq (Prot): NP_056863.1
- UniProt: O36634

Other data
- Chromosome: Genomic: 0.01 - 0.01 Mb
Search for
- Structures: Swiss-model
- Domains: InterPro

Fusion glycoprotein F0 of the human respiratory syncytial virus (RSV) is a critical fusion glycoprotein that facilitates entry of the virus into host cells by mediating the fusion of the viral and cellular membranes. This class I fusion protein is synthesized as an inactive precursor (F0), which undergoes cleavage to form two disulfide linked subunits, F1 and F2, that are essential for its fusion activity. The RSV F protein exists in two conformations: a metastable prefusion form and a stable postfusion form, with the prefusion form being a major target for neutralizing antibodies due to its role in viral entry. The structural transitions of the F protein during the fusion process are crucial for its function, making it a significant focus in the development of vaccines and antiviral therapies against RSV infections.

== See also ==
- Nirsevimab, an approved medication, whole human monoclonal antibody against F protein
