= List of infectious diseases =

This is a list of infectious diseases arranged by name, along with the infectious agents that cause them, the vaccines that can prevent or cure them when they exist and their current status. Some on the list are vaccine-preventable diseases.

== List ==
Infectious agent	Common name	Diagnosis	Treatment	Vaccine(s)
Acinetobacter baumannii	Acinetobacter infections	Culture	Supportive care	No
Actinomyces israelii, Actinomyces gerencseriae and Propionibacterium propionicus	Actinomycosis	Histologic findings	Penicillin, doxycycline, and sulfonamides	No
Adenoviridae	Adenovirus infection	Antigen detection, polymerase chain reaction assay, virus isolation, and serology	Most infections are mild and require no therapy or only symptomatic treatment.	Under research
Trypanosoma brucei	African sleeping sickness (African trypanosomiasis)	Identification of trypanosomes in a sample by microscopic examination	Fexinidazole by mouth or pentamidine by injection for T. b. gambiense. Suramin by injection is used for T. b. rhodesiense	Under research
HIV (Human immunodeficiency virus)	AIDS (acquired immunodeficiency syndrome)	Antibody test, p24 antigen test, PCR	Treatment is typically a non-nucleoside reverse transcriptase inhibitor (NNRTI) plus two nucleoside analog reverse transcriptase inhibitors (NRTIs)	Under research
Entamoeba histolytica	Amoebiasis	Microscopy	Those with symptoms require treatment with an amoebicidal tissue-active agent and a luminal cysticidal agent. Individuals that are asymptomatic only need a luminal cysticidal agent.	No
Anaplasma species	Anaplasmosis	indirect immunofluorescence antibody assay for IgG	Tetracycline drugs (including tetracycline, chlortetracycline, oxytetracycline, rolitetracycline, doxycycline, and minocycline) and imidocarb	No
Angiostrongylus	Angiostrongyliasis	Lumbar puncture, brain imaging, serology	Albendazole	No
Anisakis	Anisakiasis	Gastroscopic examination, or histopathologic examination	Albendazole	No
Bacillus anthracis	Anthrax	Culture, PCR	Large doses of intravenous and oral antibiotics, such as fluoroquinolones (ciprofloxacin), doxycycline, erythromycin, vancomycin, or penicillin	Yes
Arcanobacterium haemolyticum	Arcanobacterium haemolyticum infection	Culture in human blood agar plates	erythromycin (proposed as the first-line drug), clindamycin, gentamicin, and cephalosporins	No
Junin virus	Argentine hemorrhagic fever			Yes
Ascaris lumbricoides	Ascariasis	Fecal smear	Albendazole, mebendazole, levamisole and pyrantel pamoate	No
Aspergillus species	Aspergillosis	Chest X-ray and CT, microscopy by silver stains	Voriconazole and liposomal amphotericin B in combination with surgical debridement	No
Astroviridae species	Astrovirus infection	Electron microscopy, enzyme-immunoassay (ELISA), immunofluorescence, and polymerase chain reaction	Supportive care	No
Babesia species	Babesiosis	Giemsa-stained thin-film blood smear	Atovaquone and azithromycin. In life-threatening cases, exchange transfusion is performed.	No
Bacillus cereus	Bacillus cereus infection	Culture	Vancomycin	No
multiple bacteria	Bacterial meningitis	Lumbar puncture (contraindicated if there is a mass in the brain or the intracranial pressure is elevated), CT or MRI	Antibiotics	No
multiple bacteria	Bacterial pneumonia	Sputum Gram stain and culture, Chest radiography	Antibiotics	No
List of bacterial vaginosis microbiota	Bacterial vaginosis	Gram stain and whiff test	Metronidazole or clindamycin	No
Bacteroides species	Bacteroides infection			No
Balantidium coli	Balantidiasis	microscopic examination of stools, or colonoscopy or sigmoidoscopy	Tetracycline, metronidazole or iodoquinol	No
Bartonella	Bartonellosis	microscopy, serology, and PCR	Antibiotics	No
Baylisascaris species	Baylisascaris infection			No
BK virus	BK virus infection			No
Piedraia hortae	Black piedra	Stain or culture	Antifungal shampoos such as pyrithione zinc, formaldehyde and salicylic acid	No
Blastocystis species	Blastocystosis	microscopic examination of a chemically preserved stool specimen	Lack of scientific study to support the efficacy of any particular treatment	No
Blastomyces dermatitidis	Blastomycosis	KOH prep, cytology, or histology	Itraconazole or ketoconazole	No
Machupo virus	Bolivian hemorrhagic fever			No
Clostridium botulinum; Note: Botulism is not an infection by Clostridium botulinum but caused by the intake of botulinum toxin.	Botulism (and Infant botulism)	Enzyme-linked immunosorbent assays (ELISAs), electrochemiluminescent (ECL) tests	Botulism antitoxin and supportive care	No
Sabiá virus	Brazilian hemorrhagic fever			No
Brucella species	Brucellosis	Culture	Tetracyclines, rifampicin, and the aminoglycosides streptomycin and gentamicin	Yes
Yersinia pestis	Bubonic plague	Culture	Aminoglycosides such as streptomycin and gentamicin, tetracyclines (especially doxycycline), and the fluoroquinolone ciprofloxacin	Under research
usually Burkholderia cepacia and other Burkholderia species	Burkholderia infection			No
Mycobacterium ulcerans	Buruli ulcer	real-time PCR	The most widely used antibiotic regimen is once daily oral rifampicin plus twice daily oral clarithromycin.	No
Caliciviridae species	Calicivirus infection (Norovirus and Sapovirus)			No
Campylobacter species	Campylobacteriosis	Stool culture	Erythromycin can be used in children, and tetracycline in adults.	No
usually Candida albicans and other Candida species	Candidiasis (Moniliasis; Thrush)	oral candidiasis, the person's mouth for white patches and irritation. vaginal candidiasis, vaginal itching or soreness, pain during sexual intercourse	Antifungal medications	No
Intestinal disease by Capillaria philippinensis, hepatic disease by Capillaria hepatica and pulmonary disease by Capillaria aerophila	Capillariasis			No
Streptococcus mutans	Dental caries			Under research
Bartonella bacilliformis	Carrion's disease	Peripheral blood smear with Giemsa stain, Columbia blood agar cultures, immunoblot, indirect immunofluorescence, and PCR	Fluoroquinolones (such as ciprofloxacin) or chloramphenicol in adults and chloramphenicol plus beta-lactams in children	No
Bartonella henselae	Cat-scratch disease	Polymerase chain reaction	Azithromycin	No
usually Group A Streptococcus and Staphylococcus	Cellulitis	history and physical examination	Penicillinase-resistant semisynthetic penicillin or a first-generation cephalosporin	No
Trypanosoma cruzi	Chagas disease (American trypanosomiasis)	Microscopic examination of fresh anticoagulated blood, or its buffy coat, for motile parasites; or by preparation of thin and thick blood smears stained with Giemsa.	Benznidazole and nifurtimox (though benznidazole is the only drug available in most of Latin America)	Under research
Haemophilus ducreyi	Chancroid	Clinical diagnosis	The CDC recommendation is either a single oral dose (1 gram) of azithromycin, a single IM dose (250 mg) of ceftriaxone, oral (500 mg) of erythromycin three times a day for seven days, or oral (500 mg) of ciprofloxacin twice a day for three days.	No
Varicella zoster virus (VZV)	Chickenpox	The diagnosis of chickenpox is primarily based on the signs and symptoms, with typical early symptoms followed by a characteristic rash.	Aciclovir	Yes
Alphavirus	Chikungunya	Laboratory criteria include a decreased lymphocyte count consistent with viremia. Definitive laboratory diagnosis can be accomplished through viral isolation, RT-PCR, or serological diagnosis.	Supportive care	Yes
Chlamydia trachomatis	Chlamydia	Nucleic acid amplification tests (NAAT), such as polymerase chain reaction (PCR), transcription mediated amplification (TMA), and the DNA strand displacement amplification (SDA)	azithromycin, doxycycline, erythromycin, levofloxacin or ofloxacin	No
Chlamydophila pneumoniae	Chlamydophila pneumoniae infection (Taiwan acute respiratory agent or TWAR)			No
Vibrio cholerae	Cholera	A rapid dipstick test is available.	oral rehydration therapy (ORT)	Yes
usually Fonsecaea pedrosoi	Chromoblastomycosis	microscopy (KOH scrapings)	Itraconazole, an antifungal azole, is given orally, with or without flucytosine.	No
Batrachochytrium dendrabatidis	Chytridiomycosis			No
Clonorchis sinensis	Clonorchiasis			No
Clostridioides difficile	Clostridioides difficile colitis	Colonoscopy or sigmoidoscopy, cytotoxicity assay, toxin ELISA	Vancomycin or fidaxomicin by mouth	No
Coccidioides immitis and Coccidioides posadasii	Coccidioidomycosis			No
Colorado tick fever virus (CTFV)	Colorado tick fever (CTF)			No
usually rhinoviruses and coronaviruses	Common cold (Acute viral rhinopharyngitis; Acute coryza)	Based on symptoms	Supportive care	No
Severe acute respiratory syndrome coronavirus 2 (SARS-CoV-2)	Coronavirus disease 2019 (COVID-19)			Yes
Coxsackie B virus	Coxsackie B virus infection	Enterovirus infection is diagnosed mainly via serological tests such as ELISA and from cell culture.	There is no well-accepted treatment for the Coxsackie B group of viruses.	Under research
PRNP	Creutzfeldt–Jakob disease (CJD)			No
Crimean-Congo hemorrhagic fever virus	Crimean-Congo hemorrhagic fever (CCHF)			No
Cryptococcus neoformans	Cryptococcosis	India ink of the cerebrospinal fluid (CSF)	Intravenous Amphotericin B combined with flucytosine by mouth	No
Cryptosporidium species	Cryptosporidiosis			No
usually Ancylostoma braziliense; multiple other parasites	Cutaneous larva migrans (CLM)			No
Cyclospora cayetanensis	Cyclosporiasis			No
Taenia solium	Cysticercosis			No
Cytomegalovirus	Cytomegalovirus infection	Blood and urine tests, biopsy	Cidofovir, foscarnet, ganciclovir, valganciclovir	Under research
Dengue viruses (DEN-1, DEN-2, DEN-3 and DEN-4) – Flaviviruses	Dengue fever	Clinical diagnosis	Treatment depends on the symptoms.	Yes
Green algae Desmodesmus armatus	Desmodesmus infection			No
Dientamoeba fragilis	Dientamoebiasis			No
Corynebacterium diphtheriae	Diphtheria	Laboratory criteria: Isolation of C. diphtheriae culture; Histopathologic diagnosis; Toxin demonstration: In vivo tests (guinea pig inoculation); In vitro test: Elek's gel precipitation test, PCR, ELISA, ICA; Clinical criteria: URT illness with sore throat; Low-grade fever; An adherent, dense, grey pseudomembrane covering the posterior aspect of the pharynx	Metronidazole, Erythromycin, Procaine penicillin G	Yes
Diphyllobothrium	Diphyllobothriasis			No
Dracunculus medinensis	Dracunculiasis			No
Eastern equine encephalitis virus	Eastern equine encephalitis (EEE)	Blood tests	Corticosteroids, anticonvulsants, and supportive measures (treating symptoms)	Under research
Ebolavirus (EBOV)	Ebola hemorrhagic fever			Yes
Echinococcus species	Echinococcosis	Imaging, Serology test	Surgical removal of the cysts combined with chemotherapy	No
Ehrlichia species	Ehrlichiosis			Under research
Enterobius vermicularis	Enterobiasis (Pinworm infection)			No
Enterococcus species	Enterococcus infection			No
Enterovirus species	Enterovirus infection			No
Rickettsia prowazekii	Epidemic typhus			No
Parvovirus B19	Erythema infectiosum (Fifth disease)			No
Human herpesvirus 6 (HHV-6) and human herpesvirus 7 (HHV-7)	Exanthem subitum (Sixth disease)			No
Fasciola hepatica and Fasciola gigantica	Fasciolasis			No
Fasciolopsis buski	Fasciolopsiasis			No
PRNP	Fatal familial insomnia (FFI)			No
Filarioidea superfamily	Filariasis			No
Clostridium perfringens	Food poisoning by Clostridium perfringens	Stool test	Supportive care	No
multiple	Free-living amebic infection			No
Fusobacterium species	Fusobacterium infection			No
usually Clostridium perfringens; other Clostridium species	Gas gangrene (Clostridial myonecrosis)			No
Geotrichum candidum	Geotrichosis			No
PRNP	Gerstmann–Sträussler–Scheinker syndrome (GSS)			No
Giardia lamblia	Giardiasis	Detection of antigens on the surface of organisms in stool	Treatment is not always necessary. If medications are needed, a nitroimidazole medication is used such as metronidazole, tinidazole, secnidazole or ornidazole.	No
Burkholderia mallei	Glanders			No
Gnathostoma spinigerum and Gnathostoma hispidum	Gnathostomiasis			No
Neisseria gonorrhoeae	Gonorrhea	Gram stain and culture	Ceftriaxone by injection and azithromycin by mouth	Under research
Klebsiella granulomatis	Granuloma inguinale (Donovanosis)			No
Streptococcus pyogenes	Group A streptococcal infection	Culture	Penicillin	No
Streptococcus agalactiae	Group B streptococcal infection	Gram stain	Penicillin and ampicillin	No
Haemophilus influenzae	Haemophilus influenzae infection	Gram stain	In severe cases, cefotaxime and ceftriaxone delivered into the bloodstream, and for the less severe cases, an association of ampicillin and sulbactam, cephalosporins of the second and third generation, or fluoroquinolones are preferred.	Yes
Enteroviruses, mainly Coxsackie A virus and enterovirus 71 (EV71)	Hand, foot and mouth disease (HFMD)	A diagnosis usually can be made by the presenting signs and symptoms alone. If the diagnosis is unclear, a throat swab or stool specimen may be taken.	Medications are usually not needed as hand, foot, and mouth disease is a viral disease that typically resolves on its own.	Under research
Sin Nombre virus	Hantavirus pulmonary syndrome (HPS)			No
Heartland virus	Heartland virus disease			No
Helicobacter pylori	Helicobacter pylori infection			No
Escherichia coliO157:H7, O111 and O104:H4	Hemolytic-uremic syndrome (HUS)	First diagnosis of aHUS is often made in the context of an initial, complement-triggering infection, and Shiga-toxin has also been implicated as a trigger that identifies patients with aHUS.	Treatment involves supportive care and may include dialysis, steroids, blood transfusions, and plasmapheresis.	No
Bunyaviridae species	Hemorrhagic fever with renal syndrome (HFRS)	HFRS is difficult to diagnose on clinical grounds alone and serological evidence is often needed.	There is no cure for HFRS. Treatment involves supportive therapy including renal dialysis.	No
Hendra virus	Hendra virus infection			No
Hepatitis A virus	Hepatitis A	Blood tests	Supportive care, liver transplantation	Yes
Hepatitis B virus	Hepatitis B	Blood tests	Antiviral medication (tenofovir, interferon), liver transplantation	Yes
Hepatitis C virus	Hepatitis C	Blood testing for antibodies or viral RNA	Antivirals (sofosbuvir, simeprevir, others)	Under research
Hepatitis D Virus	Hepatitis D	Immunoglobulin G	Antivirals, pegylated interferon alpha	No
Hepatitis E virus	Hepatitis E	Hepatitis E virus (HEV)	Rest, ribavirin (if chronic)	Yes
Herpes simplex virus 1 and 2 (HSV-1 and HSV-2)	Herpes simplex	Based on symptoms, PCR, viral culture	Aciclovir, valaciclovir, paracetamol (acetaminophen), topical lidocaine	No
Histoplasma capsulatum	Histoplasmosis	Histoplasmosis can be diagnosed by samples containing the fungus taken from sputum (via bronchoalveolar lavage), blood, or infected organs.	In the majority of immunocompetent individuals, histoplasmosis resolves without any treatment. Typical treatment of severe disease first involves treatment with amphotericin B, followed by oral itraconazole.	No
Ancylostoma duodenale and Necator americanus	Hookworm infection			Under research
Human bocavirus (HBoV)	Human bocavirus infection			No
Ehrlichia ewingii	Human ewingii ehrlichiosis	The diagnosis can be confirmed by using PCR. A peripheral blood smear can also be examined for intracytoplasmic inclusions called morulae.	Doxycycline	No
Anaplasma phagocytophilum	Human granulocytic anaplasmosis (HGA)	PCR	Doxycycline	No
Human metapneumovirus (hMPV)	Human metapneumovirus infection			No
Ehrlichia chaffeensis	Human monocytic ehrlichiosis	PCR	Doxycycline	No
One of the human papillomaviruses	Human papillomavirus (HPV) infection			Yes
Human parainfluenza viruses (HPIV)	Human parainfluenza virus infection Croup			Under research
Human T-lymphotropic virus 1 (HTLV-1)	Human T-lymphotropic virus 1 infection			Under research
Hymenolepis nana and Hymenolepis diminuta	Hymenolepiasis	Examination of the stool for eggs and parasites	Praziquantel, niclosamide	No
Epstein–Barr virus (EBV)	Epstein–Barr virus infectious mononucleosis (Mono)	Diagnostic modalities for infectious mononucleosis include: Person's age, with highest risk at 10 to 30 years.; Medical history, such as close contact with other people with infectious mononucleosis; Physical examination, including palpation of any enlarged lymph nodes in the neck, or enlarged spleen.; The heterophile antibody test is a screening test that gives results.; Serological tests take longer time, but are more accurate.	Infectious mononucleosis is generally self-limiting, so only symptomatic or supportive treatments are used.	Under research
Orthomyxoviridae species	Influenza (flu)	Diagnostic methods that can identify influenza include viral cultures, antibody- and antigen-detecting tests, and nucleic acid-based tests.	Treatment of influenza in cases of mild or moderate illness is supportive and includes anti-fever medications such as acetaminophen and ibuprofen, adequate fluid intake to avoid dehydration, and resting at home.	Under research
Orthomyxoviridae species	Influenza (flu)	Diagnostic methods that can identify influenza include viral cultures, antibody- and antigen-detecting tests, and nucleic acid-based tests.	Treatment of influenza in cases of mild or moderate illness is supportive and includes anti-fever medications such as acetaminophen and ibuprofen, adequate fluid intake to avoid dehydration, and resting at home.	Yes
Isospora belli	Isosporiasis	Microscopic demonstration of the large typically shaped oocysts is the basis for diagnosis.	Trimethoprim-sulfamethoxazole	No
Japanese encephalitis virus	Japanese encephalitis	Available tests detecting JE virus-specific IgM antibodies in serum and/or cerebrospinal fluid, for example by IgM capture ELISA.	Supportive	Yes
unknown; evidence supports that it is infectious	Kawasaki disease	Based on symptoms, ultrasound of the heart	Aspirin, immunoglobulin	No
multiple	Keratitis		Infectious keratitis generally requires urgent antibacterial, antifungal, or antiviral therapy to eliminate the pathogen.	No
Kingella kingae	Kingella kingae infection			No
PRNP	Kuru	Autopsy	None	No
Lassa virus	Lassa fever	Laboratory testing	Supportive	No
Legionella pneumophila	Legionellosis (Legionnaires' disease and pontiac fever)	Urinary antigen test, sputum culture	Effective antibiotics include most macrolides (recommended: azithromycin), fluoroquinolones (recommended: levofloxacin, moxifloxacin), tetracyclines and ketolides	No
Leishmania species	Leishmaniasis	Hematology laboratory by direct visualization of the amastigotes (Leishman–Donovan bodies).	For visceral leishmaniasis in India, South America, and the Mediterranean, liposomal amphotericin B is the recommended treatment and is often used as a single dose.	Under research
Mycobacterium leprae and Mycobacterium lepromatosis	Leprosy	In countries where people are frequently infected, a person is considered to have leprosy if they have one of the following two signs: Skin lesion consistent with leprosy and with definite sensory loss.; Positive skin smears.	Rifampicin, dapsone, clofazimine	Under research
Leptospira species	Leptospirosis	Testing blood for antibodies against the bacterium or its DNA	Doxycycline, penicillin, ceftriaxone	Yes
Listeria monocytogenes	Listeriosis	Culture of blood or spinal fluid	Ampicillin, gentamicin	No
Loa Loa	Loiasis	Microscopy of blood (ideally around noon) for microfilaremia, enrichment techniques, PCR, ELISA	Albendazole, Ivermectin, Diethylcarbamazine	No
Borrelia burgdorferi, Borrelia garinii, and Borrelia afzelii	Lyme disease (Lyme borreliosis)	Based on symptoms, tick exposure, blood tests	Doxycycline, amoxicillin, ceftriaxone, cefuroxime	Under research
Wuchereria bancrofti and Brugia malayi	Lymphatic filariasis (Elephantiasis)	Microscopic examination of blood	Albendazole with ivermectin or diethylcarbamazine	No
Lymphocytic choriomeningitis virus (LCMV)	Lymphocytic choriomeningitis	Blood test	Symptomatic and supportive	No
Plasmodium species	Malaria	Examination of the blood, antigen detection tests	Antimalarial medication	Yes
Marburg virus	Marburg hemorrhagic fever (MHF)	Blood test	Supportive	Under research
Measles virus	Measles	Onset of fever and malaise about 10 days after exposure to the measles virus, followed by the emergence of cough, coryza, and conjunctivitis that worsen in severity over 4 days of appearing. Observation of Koplik's spots is also diagnostic.	Supportive care	Yes
Middle East respiratory syndrome–related coronavirus	Middle East respiratory syndrome (MERS)	rRT-PCR testing	Symptomatic and supportive	Under research
Burkholderia pseudomallei	Melioidosis (Whitmore's disease)	Growing the bacteria in culture mediums	Ceftazidime, meropenem, co-trimoxazole	No
multiple	Meningitis	Lumbar puncture	Antibiotics, antivirals, steroids	No
Neisseria meningitidis	Meningococcal disease		Treatment in primary care usually involves intramuscular administration of benzylpenicillin. Once in the hospital, the antibiotics of choice are usually IV broad spectrum 3rd generation cephalosporins.	Yes
usually Metagonimus yokagawai	Metagonimiasis	Metagonimiasis is diagnosed by eggs seen in feces.	Praziquantel	No
Microsporidia phylum	Microsporidiosis	PCR	Fumagillin has been used in the treatment. Another agent used is albendazole.	No
Molluscum contagiosum virus (MCV)	Molluscum contagiosum (MC)	Based on appearance	Cimetidine, podophyllotoxin	No
Monkeypox virus	Mpox	Testing for viral DNA	Supportive, antivirals, vaccinia immune globulin	Yes
Mumps virus	Mumps	Antibody testing, viral cultures, and reverse transcription polymerase chain reaction	Supportive	Yes
Rickettsia typhi	Murine typhus (Endemic typhus)	Early diagnosis continued to be based on clinical suspicion.	The most effective antibiotics include tetracycline and chloramphenicol.	No
Mycoplasma pneumoniae	Mycoplasma pneumonia	Chest X-Ray, Chest CT, blood test	Erythromycin, doxycycline	No
Mycoplasma genitalium	Mycoplasma genitalium infection	Nucleic acid amplification test	Azithromycin, moxifloxacin	No
numerous species of bacteria (Actinomycetoma) and fungi (Eumycetoma)	Mycetoma	Ultrasound, fine needle aspiration	Antibiotics or antifungal medication	No
parasitic dipterous fly larvae	Myiasis	Examination and serologic testing	Petroleum jelly over the central punctum	No
most commonly Chlamydia trachomatis and Neisseria gonorrhoeae	Neonatal conjunctivitis (Ophthalmia neonatorum)		Antibiotic ointment (erythromycin, tetracycline, or rarely silver nitrate or Argyrol)	No
Nipah virus	Nipah virus infection			Under research
Norovirus	Norovirus	Based on symptoms	Supportive care	Under research
PRNP	(New) Variant Creutzfeldt–Jakob disease (vCJD, nvCJD)			No
usually Nocardia asteroides and other Nocardia species	Nocardiosis	chest x-ray to analyze the lungs, a bronchoscopy, a brain/lung/skin biopsy, or a sputum culture.	trimethoprim/sulfamethoxazole or high doses of sulfonamides	No
Onchocerca volvulus	Onchocerciasis (River blindness)			Under research
Opisthorchis viverrini and Opisthorchis felineus	Opisthorchiasis			No
Paracoccidioides brasiliensis	Paracoccidioidomycosis (South American blastomycosis)			No
usually Paragonimus westermani and other Paragonimus species	Paragonimiasis			No
Pasteurella species	Pasteurellosis			No
Pediculus humanus capitis	Pediculosis capitis (Head lice)			No
Pediculus humanus corporis	Pediculosis corporis (Body lice)			No
Pthirus pubis	Pediculosis pubis (pubic lice, crab lice)			No
multiple	Pelvic inflammatory disease (PID)	Based on symptoms, ultrasound, laparoscopic surgery	Typical regimens include cefoxitin or cefotetan plus doxycycline, and clindamycin plus gentamicin.	No
Bordetella pertussis	Pertussis (whooping cough)	Nasopharyngeal swab	erythromycin, clarithromycin, or azithromycin	Yes
Yersinia pestis	Plague	Finding the bacterium in a lymph node, blood, sputum	Gentamicin and a fluoroquinolone	Under research
Streptococcus pneumoniae	Pneumococcal infection	Culture	cephalosporins, and fluoroquinolones such as levofloxacin and moxifloxacin	Yes
Pneumocystis jirovecii	Pneumocystis pneumonia (PCP)	chest X-ray and an arterial oxygen level	trimethoprim/sulfamethoxazole	No
multiple	Pneumonia	Based on symptoms, chest X-ray	Antibiotics, antivirals, oxygen therapy	No
Poliovirus	Poliomyelitis	Finding the virus in the feces or antibodies in the blood	supportive care	Yes
Prevotella species	Prevotella infection			No
usually Naegleria fowleri	Primary amoebic meningoencephalitis (PAM)	flagellation test	Miltefosine, fluconazole, amphotericin B, posaconazole, voriconazole, targeted temperature management	No
JC virus	Progressive multifocal leukoencephalopathy	finding JC virus DNA in spinal fluid, brain CT		No
Chlamydophila psittaci	Psittacosis	Culture	tetracyclines and chloramphenicol	No
Coxiella burnetii	Q fever	Based on serology	doxycycline, tetracycline, chloramphenicol, ciprofloxacin, and ofloxacin	Yes
Rabies virus	Rabies	fluorescent antibody test (FAT)	Supportive care	Yes
Borrelia hermsii, Borrelia recurrentis, and other Borrelia species	Relapsing fever	blood smear	Tetracycline-class antibiotics	No
Respiratory syncytial virus (RSV)	Respiratory syncytial virus infection	A variety of laboratory tests	Respiratory syncytial virus vaccine	Yes
Rhinosporidium seeberi	Rhinosporidiosis			No
Rhinovirus	Rhinovirus infection			No
Rickettsia species	Rickettsial infection			No
Rickettsia akari	Rickettsialpox			No
Rift Valley fever virus	Rift Valley fever (RVF)			No
Rickettsia rickettsii	Rocky Mountain spotted fever (RMSF)			No
Rotavirus	Rotavirus infection			Yes
Rubella virus	Rubella			Yes
Salmonella species	Salmonellosis			No
SARS coronavirus	Severe acute respiratory syndrome (SARS)			Under research
Sarcoptes scabiei	Scabies			No
Group A Streptococcus species	Scarlet fever			No
Schistosoma species	Schistosomiasis		Praziquantel	Under research
multiple	Sepsis			No
Shigella species	Shigellosis (bacillary dysentery)			No
Varicella zoster virus (VZV)	Shingles (Herpes zoster)			Yes
Variola major or Variola minor	Smallpox (variola)			Yes
Sporothrix schenckii	Sporotrichosis			No
Staphylococcus aureus	Staphylococcal food poisoning			No
Staphylococcus species	Staphylococcal infection			No
Strongyloides stercoralis	Strongyloidiasis			No
Measles virus	Subacute sclerosing panencephalitis			Yes
Treponema pallidum	Bejel, Syphilis, and Yaws			Under research
Taenia species	Taeniasis			No
Clostridium tetani	Tetanus (lockjaw)			Yes
Tick-borne encephalitis virus (TBEV)	Tick-borne encephalitis			Yes
usually Trichophyton species	Tinea barbae (barber's itch)			No
usually Trichophyton tonsurans	Tinea capitis (ringworm of the scalp)			No
usually Trichophyton species	Tinea corporis (ringworm of the body)			No
usually Epidermophyton floccosum, Trichophyton rubrum, and Trichophyton mentagrophytes	Tinea cruris (Jock itch)			No
Trichophyton rubrum	Tinea manum (ringworm of the hand)			No
usually Hortaea werneckii	Tinea nigra			No
usually Trichophyton species	Tinea pedis (athlete's foot)			No
usually Trichophyton species	Tinea unguium (onychomycosis)			No
Malassezia species	Tinea versicolor (Pityriasis versicolor)			No
Staphylococcus aureus or Streptococcus pyogenes	Toxic shock syndrome (TSS)			Under research
Toxocara canis or Toxocara cati	Toxocariasis (ocular larva migrans (OLM))			No
Toxocara canis or Toxocara cati	Toxocariasis (visceral larva migrans (VLM))			No
Toxoplasma gondii	Toxoplasmosis			No
Chlamydia trachomatis	Trachoma			No
Trichinella spiralis	Trichinosis			No
Trichomonas vaginalis	Trichomoniasis			No
Trichuris trichiura	Trichuriasis (whipworm infection)			No
usually Mycobacterium tuberculosis	Tuberculosis			Yes
Francisella tularensis	Tularemia			Under research
Salmonella enterica subsp. enterica, serovar typhi	Typhoid fever			Yes
Rickettsia	Typhus fever			No
Ureaplasma urealyticum	Ureaplasma urealyticum infection			No
Coccidioides immitis or Coccidioides posadasii.	Valley fever			No
Venezuelan equine encephalitis virus	Venezuelan equine encephalitis			No
Guanarito virus	Venezuelan hemorrhagic fever			No
Vibrio vulnificus	Vibrio vulnificus infection			No
Vibrio parahaemolyticus	Vibrio parahaemolyticus enteritis			No
multiple viruses	Viral pneumonia			No
West Nile virus	West Nile fever			Under research
Trichosporon beigelii	White piedra (tinea blanca)			No
Yersinia pseudotuberculosis	Yersinia pseudotuberculosis infection			No
Yersinia enterocolitica	Yersiniosis			No
Yellow fever virus	Yellow fever			Yes
Zeaspora fungus	Zeaspora			No
Zika virus	Zika fever			Under research
Mucorales order (Mucormycosis) and Entomophthorales order (Entomophthoramycosis)	Zygomycosis			No

== See also ==
- Chronic diseases and cancers linked to infectious microbes
- List of oncogenic bacteria
- List of epidemics and pandemics
- List of causes of death by rate − including specific infectious diseases and classes thereof
- List of human disease case fatality rates
- List of vaccine topics
