= Sphaerothecum destruens =

Scientific classification
- Domain: Eukaryota
- Class: Ichthyosporea
- Order: Dermocystida
- Family: incertae sedis
- Genus: Sphaerothecum
- Species: S. destruens

Binomial name
- Sphaerothecum destruens Arkush et al., 2003

Species of parasite of fish

Sphaerothecum destruens (the rosette agent) is a parasite of fish. It was first discovered in the United States in association with invasive species including topmouth gudgeon, but was found to be the causative agent of a disease in the UK affecting salmonid species such as Atlantic salmon and brown trout. It is thought to pose more of a risk in Europe than in the US, as native species there are more susceptible to the parasite. The disease causes high rates of morbidity and mortality in a number of different salmonid species and can also infect other UK freshwater fish such as bream, carp, and roach. The genus Sphaerothecum is closely related to the genera Dermocystidium and Rhinosporidium.
