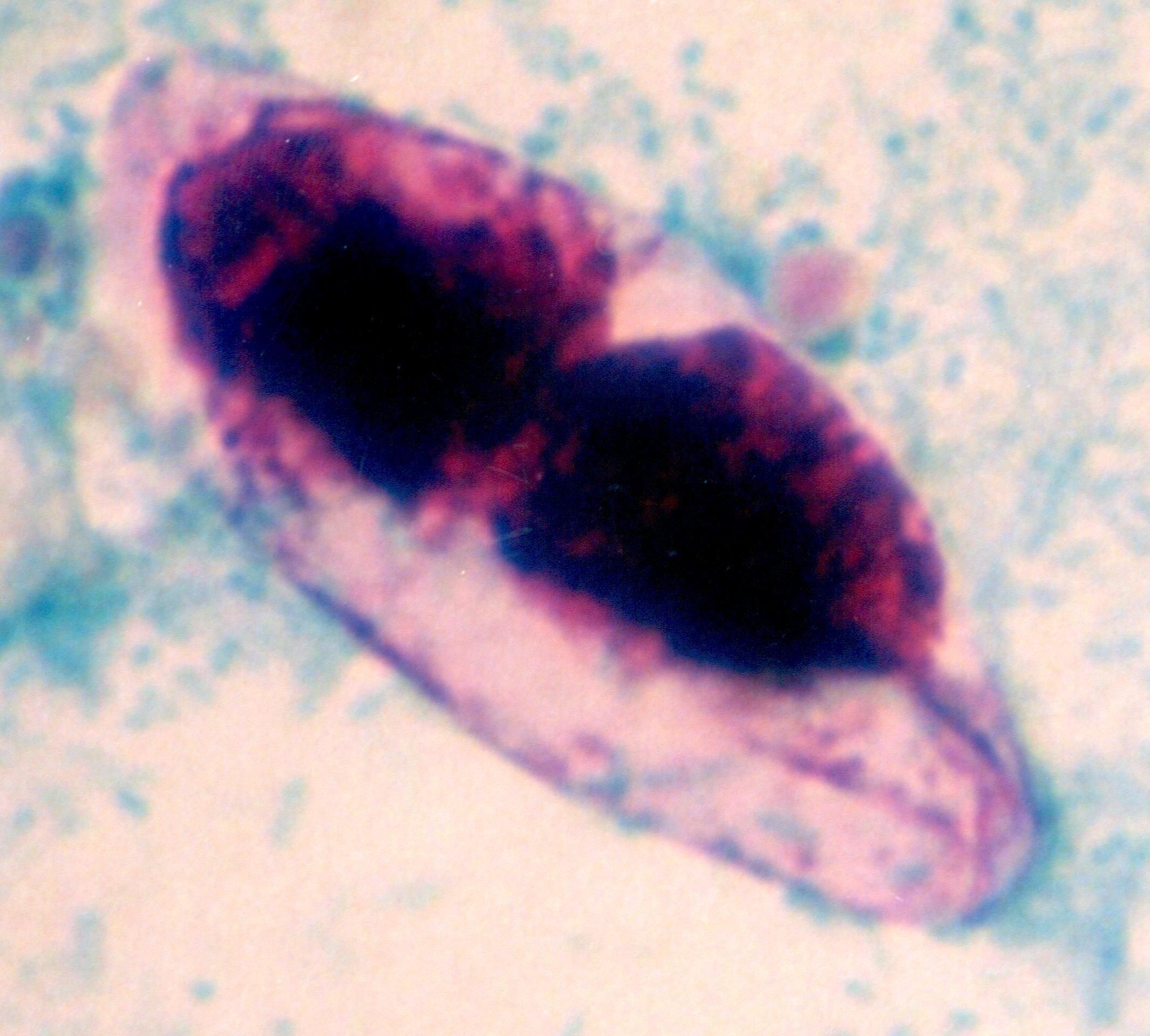
- Strained oocyst of Cystoisospora belli

Scientific classification
- Domain: Eukaryota
- Supergroup: Alveolata
- Phylum: Apicomplexa
- Class: Conoidasida
- Order: Eucoccidiorida
- Family: Sarcocystidae
- Genus: Cystoisospora; Frenkel, 1977

Species
- Cystoisospora belli; Cystoisospora canis; Cystoisospora felis Wenyon 1923; Cystoisospora ohioensis; Cystoisospora suis; Cystoisospora timoni

Synonyms
- Levineia Dubey, 1977

= Cystoisospora =

Genus of single-celled organisms

Cystoisospora is a genus of parasitic alveolates belonging to the phylum Apicomplexa.

== Taxonomy ==
This genus was originally created by J. K. Frenkel in 1977. Its use was discontinued but was resurrected in 2005. This genus currently includes species that have oocysts containing two sporocysts with four sporozoites in each without Stieda bodies. These species infect the enterocytes of mammals and are transmitted by the orofaecal route.

DNA analysis has shown that this genus belongs to the family Sarcocystidae.

The type species of this genus is Cystoisospora felis.

== Life cycle ==
This parasite has been isolated from dogs, cats and raccoons. C. belli has been isolated from immunosuppressed humans — particularly those with HIV infection.

These parasites normally infect the enterocytes of the small intestine and are spread by the orofaecal route. The definitive hosts are cats but other species including various species of rodents may be infected. No further development occurs in these paratenic hosts and the parasites remain dormant until ingested by a definitive host.

== Epidemiology ==
This genus has been recorded worldwide. C. felis and C. rivolta occur in up to 40% of cats in some tropical countries. C. belli is also common in the tropics and causes a human gastrointestinal infection mainly found in people who are profoundly immunosuppressed as a result of HIV infection.

== Clinical ==
Clinical signs include watery diarrhea, vomiting, fever and weight loss. The diagnosis is made by microscopic examination of the stool. Distinguishing between the species of Cystoisospora is most easily done with PCR. This method can also be used to make the diagnosis.

Treatment is based on trimethoprim-sulfonamides with clindamycin or toltrazuril for resistant strains.

== Prevention ==
Hygiene on the premises is important in prevention. Good litter tray hygiene is also critical in multi-cat households. Utensils, runs, cages and other implements should be steam-cleaned or washed in boiling water. Because of the importance of paratenic hosts such as cockroaches, insect control is critical.
