= Carnivore bocaparvovirus 1 =

Virus classification
- (unranked): Virus
- Realm: Floreoviria
- Kingdom: Shotokuvirae
- Phylum: Cossaviricota
- Class: Quintoviricetes
- Order: Piccovirales
- Family: Parvoviridae
- Genus: Bocaparvovirus
- Species: Carnivore bocaparvovirus 1

Synonyms
- Canine minute virus

Species of virus

Carnivore bocaparvovirus 1, formerly Canine minute virus (or minute virus of canines; MVC) is a species of Bocaparvovirus of the family Parvoviridae that infects dogs. It is similar to bovine parvovirus in its protein structure and DNA. A virus causing respiratory disease in humans has been called human bocavirus due to its similarity to these viruses. Canine minute virus was originally discovered in Germany in 1967 in military dogs, although it was originally thought to not cause disease. Dogs and puppies are infected orally, and the virus is spread transplacentally to the fetuses. Symptoms are seen most commonly between the ages of one and three weeks and include severe diarrhea, difficulty breathing, and anorexia. In severe cases, illness can be fatal.

In experimental infections, the virus is spread transplacentally when the dam is infected between 25 and 30 days of gestation and can result in abortion. When the dam is infected between 30 and 35 days, the puppies were sometimes born with myocarditis and anasarca. Pathological lesions in fetuses in experimental infections were found in the lung and small intestine.
