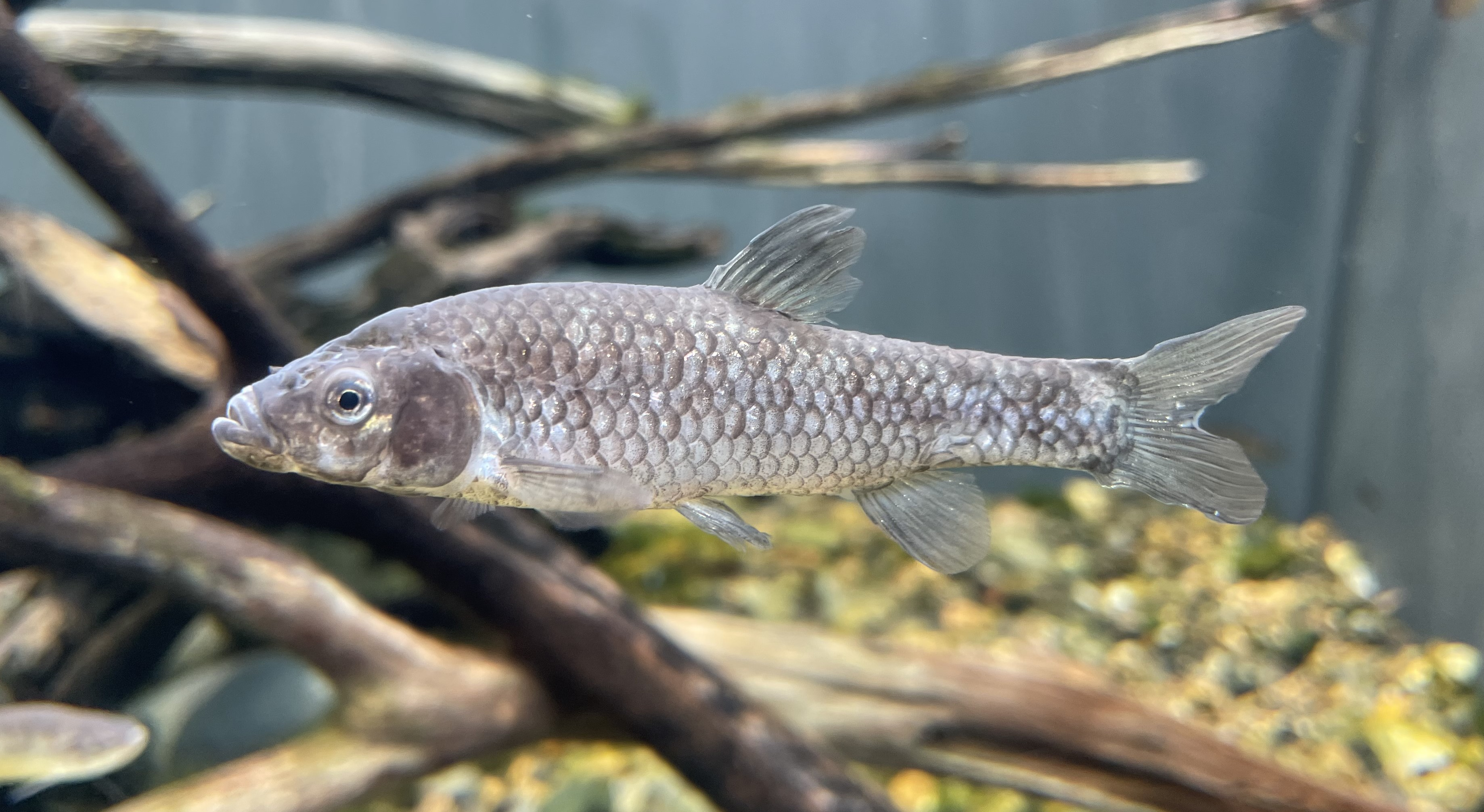

Conservation status
- Vulnerable (IUCN 3.1)

Scientific classification
- Kingdom: Animalia
- Phylum: Chordata
- Class: Actinopterygii
- Order: Cypriniformes
- Suborder: Cyprinoidei
- Family: Gobionidae
- Genus: Pseudorasbora
- Species: P. pugnax

Binomial name
- Pseudorasbora pugnax Kawase & Hosoya, 2015

= Pseudorasbora pugnax =

Species of cyprinid fish

Pseudorasbora pugnax is a species of freshwater ray-finned fish belonging to the family Gobionidae, the gudgeons. This fish is endemic to Honshu, Japan.
