= Pseudorasbora elongata =

Conservation status
- Least Concern (IUCN 3.1)

Scientific classification
- Kingdom: Animalia
- Phylum: Chordata
- Class: Actinopterygii
- Order: Cypriniformes
- Suborder: Cyprinoidei
- Family: Gobionidae
- Genus: Pseudorasbora
- Species: P. elongata

Binomial name
- Pseudorasbora elongata Wu, 1939

Species of fish

Pseudorasbora elongata is a species of freshwater ray-finned fish belonging to the family Gobionidae, the gudgeons. This fish is found in the Li River and lower reaches of the Yangtze in China.
