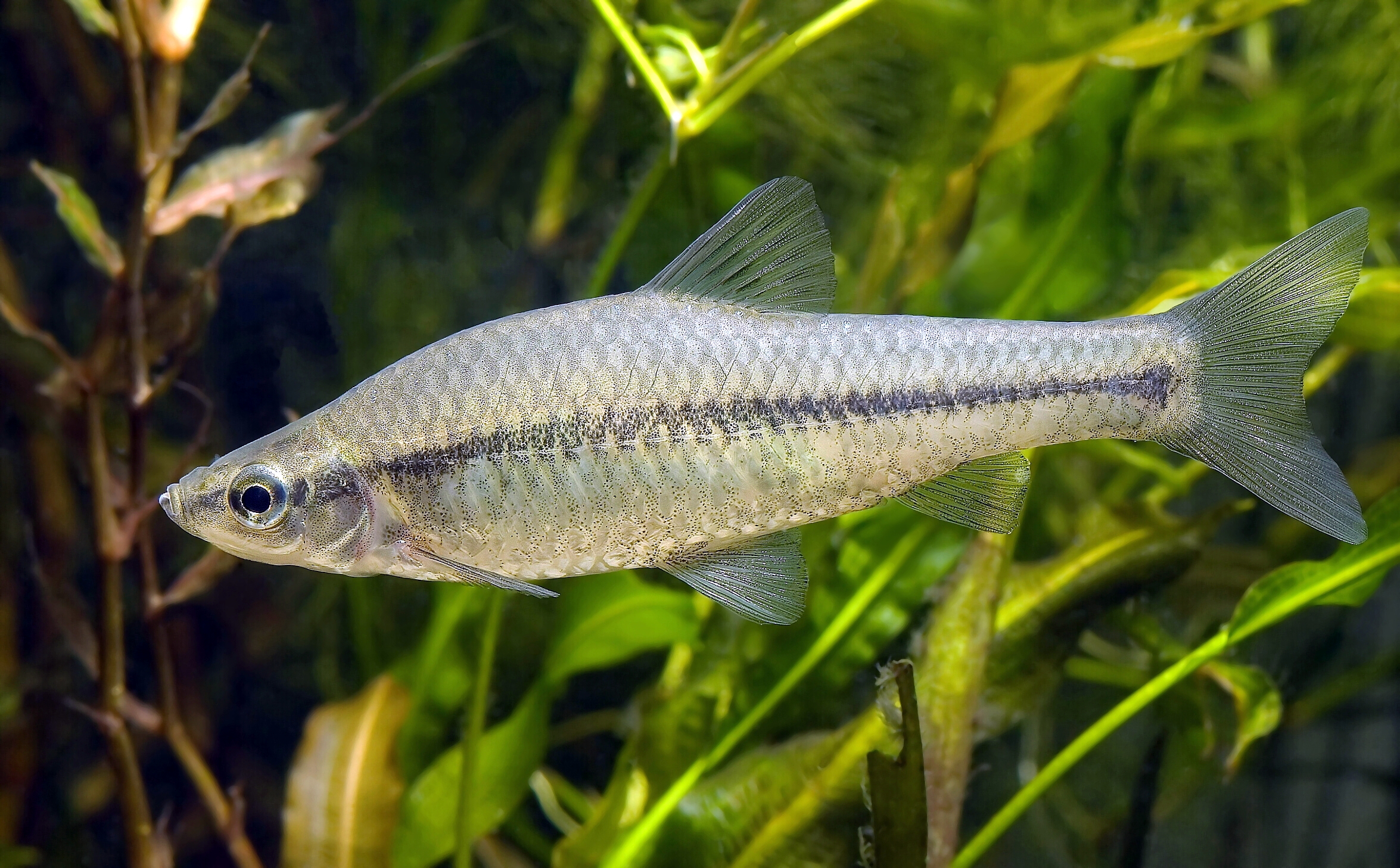

Conservation status
- Least Concern (IUCN 3.1)

Scientific classification
- Kingdom: Animalia
- Phylum: Chordata
- Class: Actinopterygii
- Division: Teleostei
- Order: Cypriniformes
- Suborder: Cyprinoidei
- Family: Gobionidae
- Genus: Pseudorasbora
- Species: P. parva

Binomial name
- Pseudorasbora parva (Temminck & Schlegel, 1846)

Synonyms
- Leuciscus parvus Temminck & Schlegel, 1846; Leuciscus pusillus Temminck & Schlegel, 1846; Micraspius mianowskii Dybowski, 1869; Pseudorasbora altipinna Nichols, 1925; Pseudorasbora depressirostris Nichols, 1925; Pseudorasbora fowleri Nichols, 1925; Pseudorasbora monstrosa Nichols, 1925; Pseudorasbora parva parvula Nichols, 1929; Pseudorasbora parva tenuis Nichols, 1929

= Stone moroko =

Species of fish

The stone moroko (Pseudorasbora parva), also known as the topmouth gudgeon, is a species of freshwater ray-finned fish belonging to the family Gobionidae, the gudgeons. This species is native to Asia, but has been introduced and is now considered an invasive species in Europe and North America. The fish's size is rarely above 8 cm, and usually 2 to 7.5 cm (0.79 to 2.95 in) long.

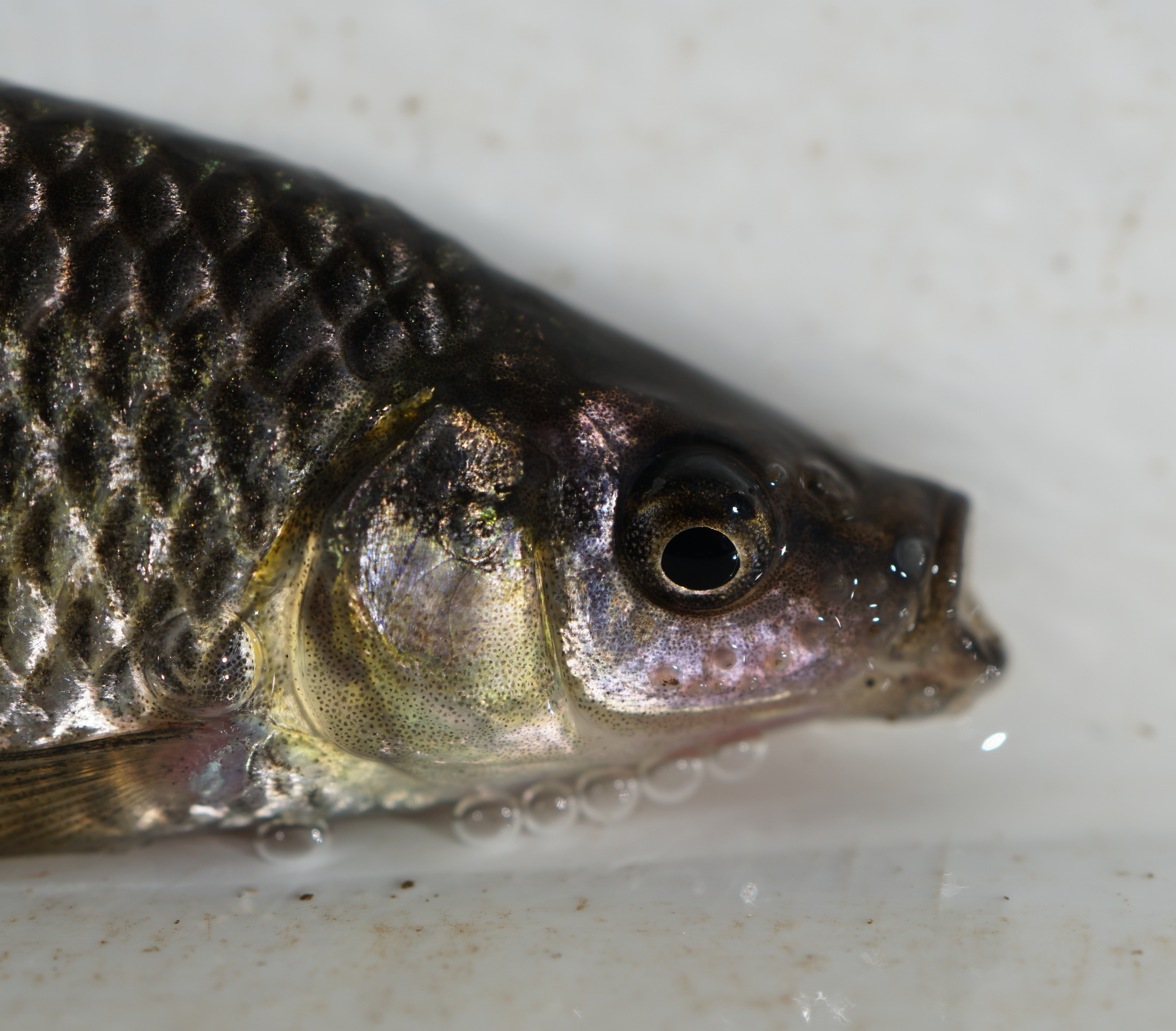
Stone moroko has a superior mouth

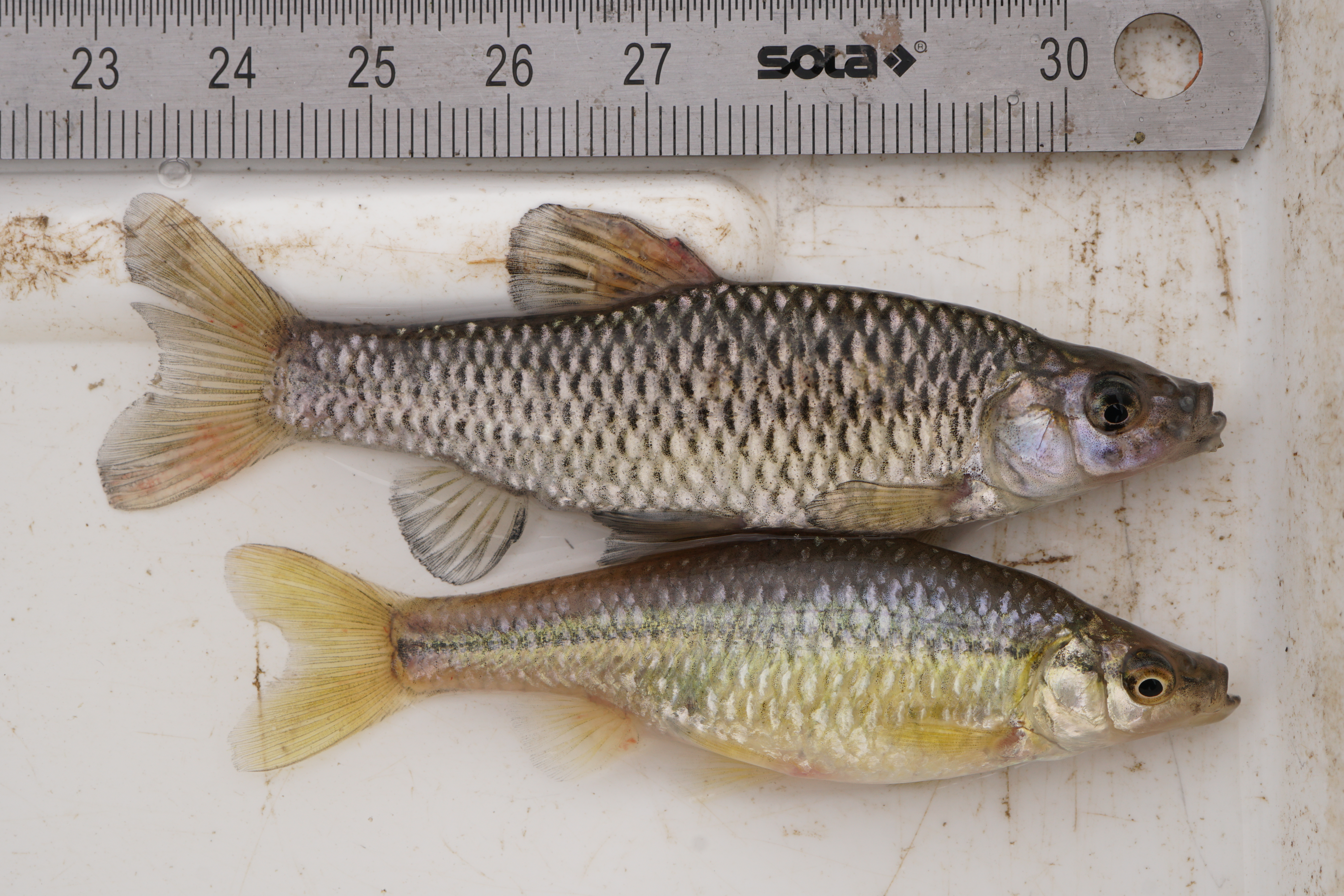
Topmouth Gudeons may have varying colors in the spawning season

== Invasive species ==
In Europe, P. parva has been included since 2016 on the list of Invasive Alien Species of Union concern (the Union list). This implies that this species cannot be imported, bred, transported, commercialized, or intentionally released into the environment in the whole of the European Union.

The fish was introduced in the 1960s into ponds in Nucet, Dâmbovița County, Romania, and made its way into Danube, then spreading throughout Europe.

These fish feed on eggs of locally valuable native fish species.

Four phylogenetic lineages of Pesudorasbora parva were identified within its native range, and three of them contributed to the dispersal within more western regions of Eurasia. One of these lineages was initially distributed in the north of China and the Far East of Russia; the second was in southern China; the third was in the Korean Peninsula and, probably, in the adjacent regions of China; and the fourth was in Taiwan. Geographical distribution of COI lineages suggests three donor regions of stone moroko invasions into more western regions of Eurasia: the basin of the Yangtze River, the northern (Russian) part of the Amur River basin, and the Sungari River basin (right tributary of the Amur in the territory of China).

The species has also been recently discovered in several lakes in the UK, where it is believed to have been illegally stocked. This has called for a large scale eradication programme organised by the Environment Agency, who kill the fish off with a piscicide called rotenone.

== Parasites ==
Pseudorasbora parva poses a danger to other species such as the sunbleaks (Leucaspius delineatus). These fish are the carrier of a parasite, the protist Sphaerothecum destruens, that is not damaging to the topmouth gudgeon, but attacks other fishes like the sunbleaks, which are unable to spawn and have a higher mortality when infected.

A 2023 study showed co-introduction of three monogenean species, Dactylogyrus squameus, Bivaginogyrus obscurus, and Gyrodactylus pseudorasborae into Europe, along with their fish host from East Asia. In addition to co-introduced parasites, the fish was infected with a local generalist, the monogenean Gyrodactylus prostae. Monogenean infections were generally lower in non-native host fish, potentially giving an advantage to this invading species.
