= Hookworm vaccine =

Vaccine against hookworm parasite

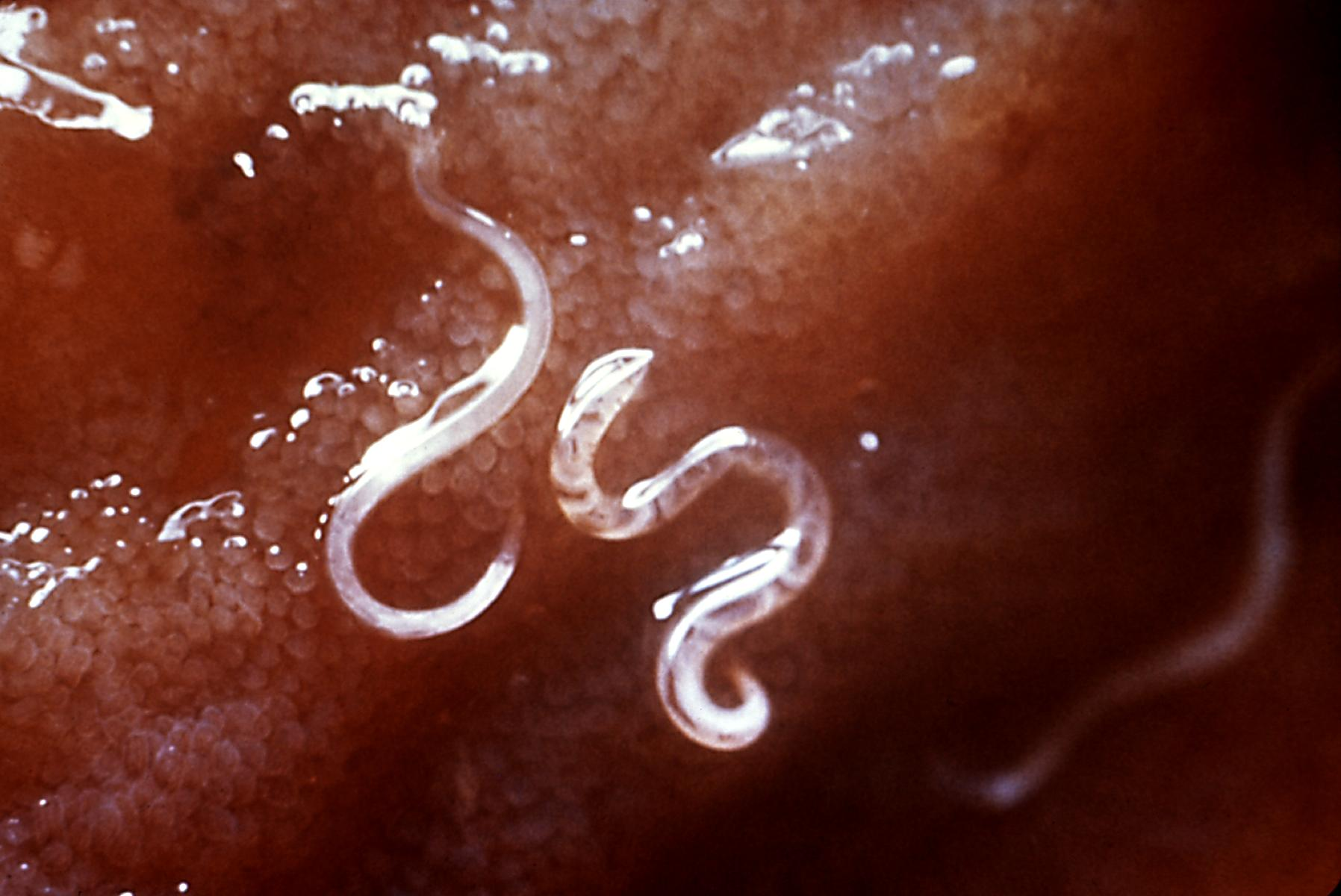
Hookworm

Hookworm vaccine is a vaccine against hookworm. No effective vaccine for the disease in humans has yet been developed. Hookworms, parasitic nematodes transmitted in soil, infect approximately 700 million humans, particularly in tropical regions of the world where endemic hookworms include Ancylostoma duodenale and Necator americanus. Hookworms feed on blood and those infected with hookworms may develop chronic anaemia and malnutrition. Helminth infection can be effectively treated with benzimidazole drugs (such as mebendazole or albendazole), and efforts led by the World Health Organization have focused on one to three yearly de-worming doses in schools because hookworm infections with the heaviest intensities are most common in school-age children. However, these drugs only eliminate existing adult parasites and re-infection can occur soon after treatment. School-based de-worming efforts do not treat adults or pre-school children and concerns exist about drug resistance developing in hookworms against the commonly used treatments, thus a vaccine against hookworm disease is sought to provide more permanent resistance to infection.

Hookworm infection is considered a neglected disease as it disproportionately affects poorer localities and has received little attention from pharmaceutical companies.

== Vaccine targets ==
Hookworm infections in humans can last for several years, and re-infection can occur very shortly after treatment, suggesting that hookworms effectively evade—and may interrupt or modulate—the host immune system. Successful hookworm vaccines have been developed for several animal species. On the basis of prior work, human vaccine development has targeted antigens from both the larval and adult stages of the hookworm life cycle; a combined vaccine for humans that would provide more complete protection. Current targets of larval proteins attenuate larval migration through host tissue; targets of adult proteins have been demonstrated to block enzymes vital to hookworm feeding.

The "ASP" (ancylostoma secreted protein) proteins are cysteine-rich secretory proteins. They are promising vaccine candidates based on previous vaccine studies in sheep, guinea pigs, cattle, and mice, which have demonstrated inhibition of hookworm larval migration. Furthermore, epidemiologic studies determined that high titers of circulating antibodies against ASPs are associated with lower hookworm burdens in residents of Hainan Province, China, and Minas Gerais, Brazil. The function of Na-ASP-2 (Q7Z1H1) is not currently known (though it may function as a chemotaxin mimic), but it is known to be released during parasite entry into the host. It may have some function in the transition from the larval environment stage of the hookworm life-cycle to an adult parasitic existence and tissue migration.

The "APR" proteins are aspartic proteases. Ac-APR-1 and Na-APR-1 specifically participate in the hookworm's digestion of hemoglobin from its blood meal and are present in the adult stage of the hookworm life cycle. Animals immunized against Ac-APR-1 exhibited a reduction in worm burden, a reduction in hemoglobin loss, and a dramatic reduction in worm fecundity.

The "GST" proteins are glutathione S-transferases. Na-GST-1 (D3U1A5) plays a role in the worm's digestion of hemoglobin; specifically, it serves to protect the worm from heme molecules released by digestion.

== Research ==
Examples of antigenic targets of hookworm vaccines currently in clinical trials include Na-ASP-2, Ac-APR-1, Na-APR-1, and Na-GST-1.

In a clinical trial a vaccine containing recombinant Na-ASP-2 with Aluminium hydroxide (Alhydrogel) as an adjuvant was found to increase T_{h}2 helper cells and IgE. Both the Th2 helper cells and IgE antibody are important players in recognition and immunoregulation against parasites. The vaccine containing recombinant Na-ASP-2 resulted in significantly decreased risk of a hookworm infection.

In 2014, Na-GST-1 with Alhydrogel adjuvant completed a successful phase 1 clinical trial in Brazil. In 2017, it completed a successful phase 1 trial in the US.

=== Funding ===
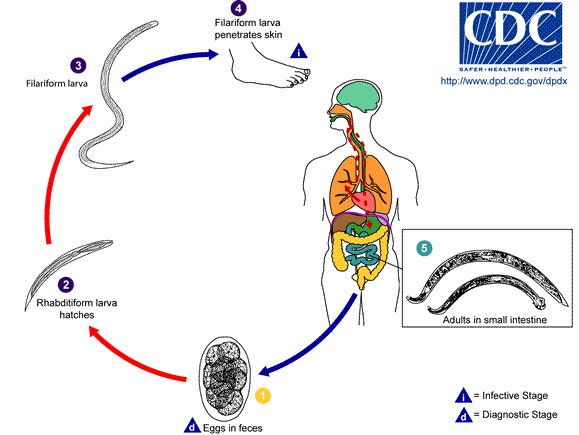
Hookworm life cycle

Research funding to develop hookworm vaccines has come from the Human Hookworm Vaccine Initiative, a program of the Sabin Vaccine Institute and collaborations with George Washington University, the Oswaldo Cruz Foundation, the Chinese Institute of Parasitic Diseases, the Queensland Institute of Medical Research, and the London School of Hygiene and Tropical Medicine. Funding for hookworm vaccine research efforts also includes funds from the Bill & Melinda Gates Foundation totaling in excess of $53 million, and additional support from the Rockefeller Foundation, Doctors Without Borders, National Institute of Allergy and Infectious Diseases, and the March of Dimes Birth Defects Foundation.

The government of Brazil, where hookworm is still endemic in some poorer areas, has promised to manufacture a vaccine if one can be proven effective.
