= Cystoisospora canis =

Scientific classification
- Domain: Eukaryota
- Clade: Sar
- Clade: Alveolata
- Phylum: Apicomplexa
- Class: Conoidasida
- Order: Eucoccidiorida
- Family: Sarcocystidae
- Genus: Cystoisospora
- Species: C. canis

Binomial name
- Cystoisospora canis (Nemesri, 1960)

Synonyms
- Isospora canis Nemesri, 1960

Species of single-celled organism

Cystoisospora canis, previously known as Isospora canis, is a microscopic, coccidian parasite that causes an intestinal tract infection in dogs. The intestinal tract infection is coccidiosis caused by a protozoon (one-celled organisms) called coccidia.

== Background ==
Cystoisospora, previously known Isospora, is a genus that causes coccidiosis in humans, dogs and cats. Coccidiosis is multiple gastrointestinal infections caused by members of the sporozoan parasite coccidium which includes Cystoisospora.

Species that can infect dogs are Cystoisospora canis, Cystoisospora ohioensis, Cystoisospora neorivolta, and Cystoisospora burrowsi. C. Canis oocysts are larger in size compared to the other three and the other three are structurally similar to each other but not with C. Canis, making it easy to identify. C. ohioensis, C. burrowsi, and C. neorivolta oocysts are similar in structure so they cannot be distinguished from each other until further diagnosis.

== Life cycle and transmission ==
For a dog to become infected, the dog has to have ingested oocysts that can be found in fecal material or another host animal. When a dog is infected, the parasite can be found in the small intestinal epithelium which are the cells that line the cavity of the small intestine. It can also be found in tissues such as spleen, liver, and mesenteric lymph nodes (located in the walls of the intestines). Sporulated oocyst then releases 8 sporozoites. These sporozoites attack the intestinal epithelial cells where they develop into a schizont. Schizonts are part of the asexual stages where there are three generations of schizonts. After the last part of the multiplication process, gametes are formed. Gametes are part of the sexual stages, and they can invade other cells. Male gametes divide and break out to the host cell, then go invade cells containing the female gamete. Once the male gametes and the female gamete are in the same host cell, they will fuse creating a zygote. The zygote develops into an oocyst. The oocyst then breaks out of the host cell and leaves the host through its feces. The oocyst are noninfectious in the feces but will sporulate in 4 days becoming infectious for the next host and for the cycle to begin again. The clinical signs associated with Cystoisospora canis are severe when the oocysts ingested are sporulated instead of being ingested unsporulated.

== Clinical signs ==
Coccidiosis is not usually a great threat to the dog’s health unless the dog is weak or has a low immune system. In some cases infection is asymptomatic this is generally the case for adult dogs. In other cases mostly found in puppies and older dogs the coccidial parasite can cause anemia, weight loss, abdominal pain, vomiting, anorexia, watery diarrhea, fever, dehydration, and mental depression.

If left untreated it can lead to the death of the infected dog.

== Diagnosis ==
The time between infection and when the parasite can be detected (the prepatent period) is about 9–11 days. To detect the parasite, a fecal flotation examination is performed. This examination is where a sample of stool is examined under a microscope to see if there are parasites present.

== Treatments ==
Antibiotics can decrease the presence of the parasites and restores the dog’s health. The antibiotics should be taken for 10 to 14 days. Some of the antibiotics include sulfadimethoxine and amprolium.

== Prevalence ==
Coccidia is found in 3% to 38% of dogs in North America.

== Control and prevention ==
To prevent coccidia, sanitation is key to make sure the environment is free of feces. Rapid removal of feces is important because C. Canis can develop quickly into the infectious stages of its life cycle. Mature oocysts are resistant to most cleaning products and can live for long periods of time. Using stronger cleaning products that contain ammonia or steam cleaning will kill the infectious oocysts. Another way to prevent infection is to not let the dog ingest rodents which could be carrying the parasites.
