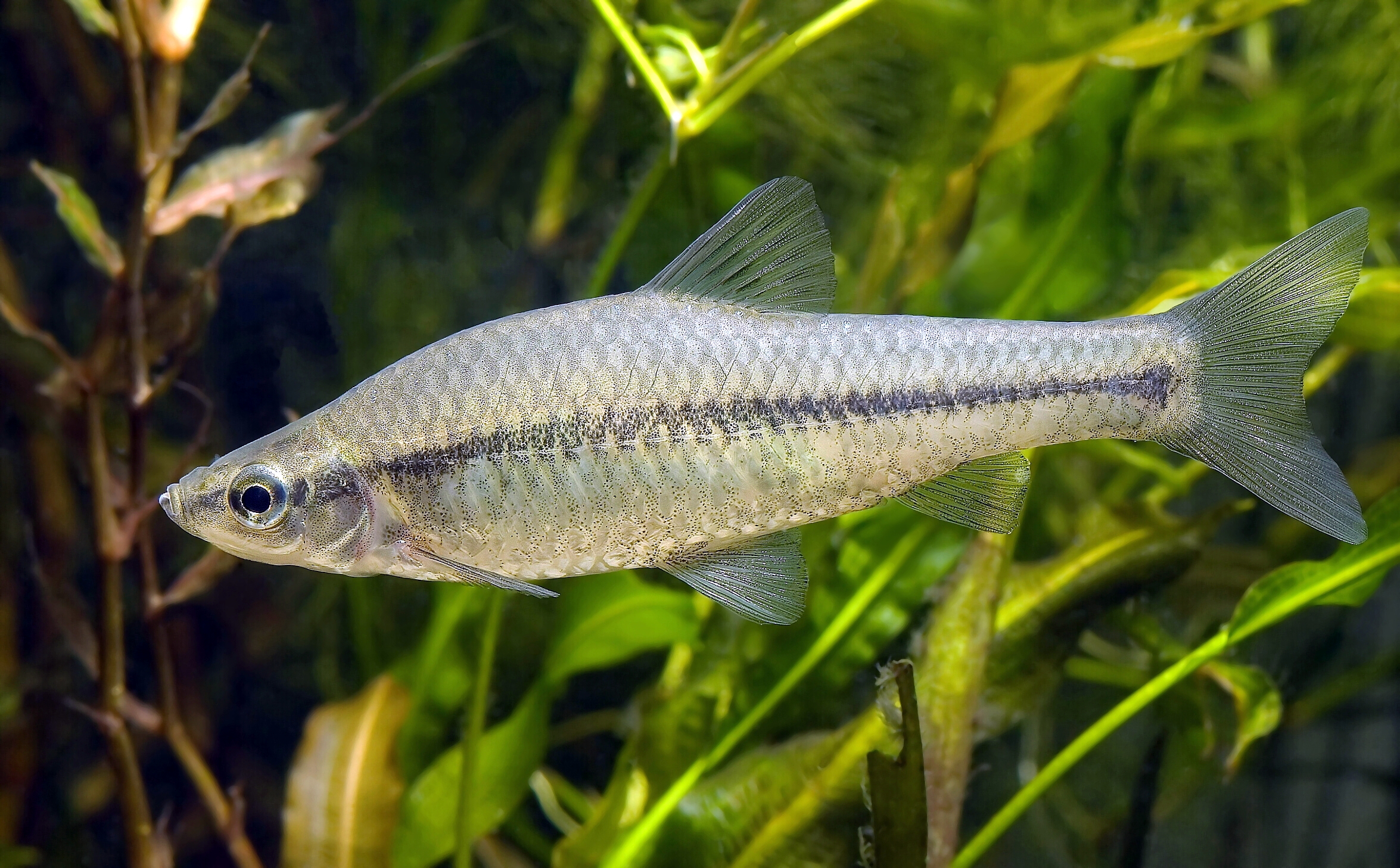
- Stone moroko (Pseudorasbora parva)

Scientific classification
- Kingdom: Animalia
- Phylum: Chordata
- Class: Actinopterygii
- Order: Cypriniformes
- Family: Gobionidae
- Genus: Pseudorasbora; Bleeker, 1860

Type species
- Leuciscus pusillus Temminck & Schlegel, 1846

Synonyms
- Fundulichthys Bleeker, 1860; Micraspius Dybowski, 1869

= Pseudorasbora =

Genus of fishes

Pseudorasbora is a genus of freshwater ray-finned fish belonging to the family Gobionidae, the gudgeons. These fishes are native to eastern Asia, including China, Korea, Japan and Siberia. P. parva, has been introduced to regions outside its native range and is considered invasive.

== Species ==
There are currently 5 recognized species in this genus:

- Pseudorasbora elongata H. W. Wu, 1939
- Pseudorasbora interrupta Z. Xiao, Z. H. Lan & X. L. Chen, 2007
- Pseudorasbora parva Temminck & Schlegel, 1846 (Stone moroko, topmouth gudgeon)
- Pseudorasbora pugnax Kawase & Hosoya, 2015
- Pseudorasbora pumila Miyadi, 1930 (Moroco)
