= Rhinosporidium seeberi =

Scientific classification
- Domain: Eukaryota
- (unranked): Holozoa
- Class: Ichthyosporea
- Order: Dermocystida
- Family: Dermocystidiaceae
- Genus: Rhinosporidium A. Minchin & H. Fantham, 1905
- Species: R. seeberi

Binomial name
- Rhinosporidium seeberi (Wernicke) Seeber

Synonyms
- Coccidium seeberi Wernicke 1903; Rhinosporidium ayyari Allen & Dave 1936; Rhinosporidium equi Zschokke 1913; Rhinosporidium kinealyi Minchin & Fantham 1905

Eukaryotic pathogen

Rhinosporidium seeberi is a eukaryotic pathogen responsible for rhinosporidiosis, a disease which affects humans, horses, dogs, and to a lesser extent cattle, cats, foxes, and birds. It is most commonly found in tropical areas, especially India and Sri Lanka.

The pathogen was first identified in 1892, and was comprehensively described in 1900 by Seeber.

Many aspects of the disease and of the pathogen Rhinosporidium seeberi remain problematic and enigmatic. These include the pathogen’s natural habitat, some aspects of its ‘lifecycle’, its immunology, some aspects of the epidemiology of the disease in humans and in animals, the reasons for the delay at in vitro culture, and establishment of disease in experimental animals, hence paucity of information on its sensitivity to drugs, and the immunology of the pathogen. Thankamani isolated an organism believed to be R. seeberi and gave the name "UMH.48." It was originally isolated from the biopsies and nasal swabs of rhinosporidiosis patients. The various developmental stages of UMH.48 showed a strong resemblance with the structures seen in hisopathological sections of rhinosporidiosis in tissue samples. The spores of UMH.48 were found to be viable even after a decade of preservation in the refrigerator without any subculture, resembling the features of Synchytrium endobioticum, a lower aquatic fungus that causes black wart disease in potatoes. However, carefully performed molecular studies showed the definitive identity of the organism.

== Phylogeny ==
For most of the 20th century, the classification of R. seeberi was unclear (being considered either a fungus or a protist), but it was shown to be part of a group called the Mesomycetozoea (or "DRIP clade"), which includes a number of well-known fish pathogens such as Dermocystidium and Sphaerothecum destruens. The Mesomycetozoea are neither part of the fungi nor of animals, but diverged from them close to the time when they diverged from each other.

Rhinosporidium is generally classified as having a single species, although some evidence indicates that different host species may be infected by different strains.

== Epidemiology ==
Infection in humans with this organism has been reported from about 70 countries, with the majority of cases (95%) reported from India and Sri Lanka; per capita, Sri Lanka has the highest incidence in the world. The disease is also found in other parts of the world.

An all-India survey conducted in 1957 found that this disease was absent from the states of Jammu and Kashmir, Himachal Pradesh, Punjab, Haryana and the north eastern states of India. In Tamil Nadu, four endemic areas were identified in the survey—(Madurai, Ramnad, Rajapalayam, and Sivaganga). The common factor found in these areas was the practice of bathing in common ponds.

== Transmission and dissemination ==
1. Demellow's theory of infection
2. Karunarathnae's autoinoculation theory
3. Haematogenous spread – to distant sites
4. Lymphatic spread – causing lymphadenitis (rare)

Demellow postulated that while bathing in common ponds, the nasal mucosa came into contact with infectious material. Karunarathnae proposed that the satellite lesions in skin and conjunctival mucosa arose as a result of autoinoculation.

Because of its relationship to fish pathogens, Rhinosporidium is presumed to have evolved from aquatic pathogens similar to the other Mesomycetozoea and evolved to infect mammal and bird hosts. If this happened once or more than once is unknown.

== Natural habitat ==
Karunarathnae also proposed that Rhinosporidium existed in a dimorphic state—a saprotroph in soil and water and a yeast form inside living tissues. Recent studies done using fluorescent in situ hybridization techniques provide evidence that its natural habitat is reservoir water, and perhaps, soil contaminated with this water.

== Pathology ==
One report indicates that patients with rhinosporidiosis possess anti-R. seeberi IgG to an inner wall antigen expressed only during the mature sporangial stage. This finding suggests that the mapping of antigenic proteins may lead to important antigens with the potential as vaccine candidates.

Humoral and cell-mediated immune responses in human patients and in experimental mice have been defined; several mechanisms of immune evasion by R. seeberi have been identified.

A novel method for the determination of the viability of rhinosporidial endospores by MTT-reduction led to the study of the sensitivity of endospores to biocides and antimicrobial drugs (paper in preparation for submission).

== Clinical features ==
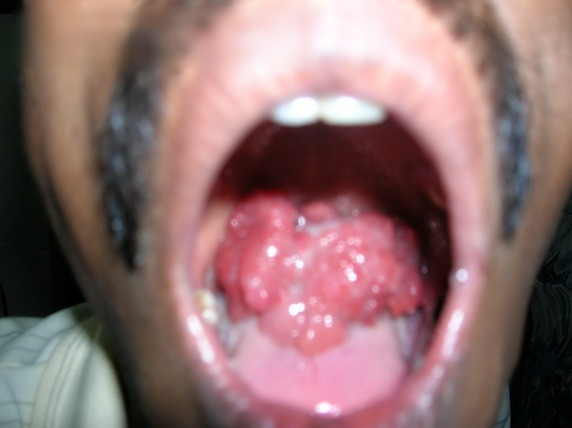
Image showing a large rhinosporidial mass in the oropharynx of a patient

This organism infects the mucosa of the nasal cavity, producing a mass-like lesion. This mass appears to be polypoidal in nature with a granular surface speckled with whitish spores. The rhinosporidial mass has been classically described as a strawberry-like mulberry mass. This mass may extend from the nasal cavity into the nasopharynx and present itself in the oral cavity. These lesions commonly cause bleeding from the nasal cavity.

R. seeberi can also affect the lacrimal gland and also rarely the skin and genitalia.

Common sites affected:

1. Nose – 78%
2. Nasopharynx – 68%
3. Tonsil – 3%
4. Eye – 1%
5. Skin – very rare

== Treatment ==
Treatment is generally by surgical removal of the infected tissues.

Povidone-iodine and antifungal drugs such as amphotericin B, dapsone, and silver nitrate have been suggested as possible antiseptics.

== See also ==
- List of parasites (human)
