= Pseudorasbora interrupta =

Conservation status
- Data Deficient (IUCN 3.1)

Scientific classification
- Kingdom: Animalia
- Phylum: Chordata
- Class: Actinopterygii
- Order: Cypriniformes
- Family: Gobionidae
- Genus: Pseudorasbora
- Species: P. interrupta

Binomial name
- Pseudorasbora interrupta Xiao, Lan & Chen, 2007

Species of fish

Pseudorasbora interrupta is a species of freshwater ray-finned fish belonging to the family Gobionidae, the gudgeons. This fish is endemic to streams on Fenghuang Mountain in Guangdong, China.
