= Rhinosporidiosis =

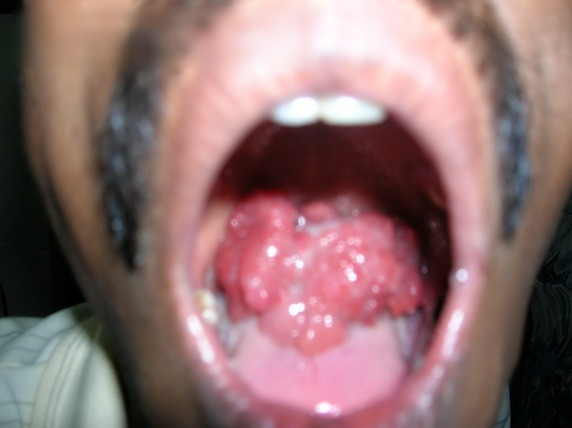
- Rhinosporidiosis in oropharynx
- Specialty: Infectious disease

Rhinosporidiosis is an infection caused by Rhinosporidium seeberi.

== Classification ==
This organism was previously considered to be a fungus, and rhinosporidiosis is classified as a fungal disease under ICD-10. It is now considered to be a protist classified under Mesomycetozoea.

Authors of detailed studies have revealed superficial similarities between Dermocystidium and Rhinosporidium when using light microscopy, but substantial morphological differences between the groups exist.

There is some evidence that DNA extracted from purified uncontaminated round bodies (Rhinosporidium seeberi) is of cyanobacterial origin.

== Pathophysiology ==
Rhinosporidiosis is a granulomatous disease affecting the mucous membrane of nasopharynx, oropharynx, conjunctiva, rectum and external genitalia. Though the floor of the nose and inferior turbinate are the most common sites, the lesions may appear elsewhere too. Traumatic inoculation from one site to others is common. Laryngeal rhinosporidiosis, too, has been described and may be due to inoculation from the nose during endotracheal intubation. After inoculation, the organism replicates locally, resulting in hyperplasia of host tissue and localised immune response.

- infection of nose and nasopharynx - 70%
- infection of palpebral conjunctiva - 15%

== Diagnosis ==
- History
  - Unilateral nasal obstruction
  - Epistaxis
  - Local pruritus
  - Rhinorrhea
  - Coryza (rhinitis) with sneezing
  - Post nasal discharge with cough
  - Foreign body sensation
  - History of exposure to contaminated water
  - Increased tearing and photo phobia in cases of infection of palpebral conjunctiva
- On examination
  - Pink to deep red polyps
  - Strawberry like appearance
  - Bleeds easily upon manipulation
- Diagnosis
  - confirmed by biopsy and histopathology - several round or oval sporangia and spores which may be seen bursting through its chitinous wall

== Treatment ==
- Surgical excision - wide excision with wide area electro-coagulation of the lesion base
- Medical treatment is not so effective but treatment with a year-long course of dapsone has been reported
- Recurrence is common

== Epidemiology ==
Disease endemic in Chhattisgarh South India, Sri Lanka, South America and Africa. It is presumed to be transmitted by exposure to the pathogen when taking a bath in stagnant water pools where animals also bathe. It is also common in South Asian countries.
