= Schistosomiasis vaccine =

Vaccine against a parasitic disease

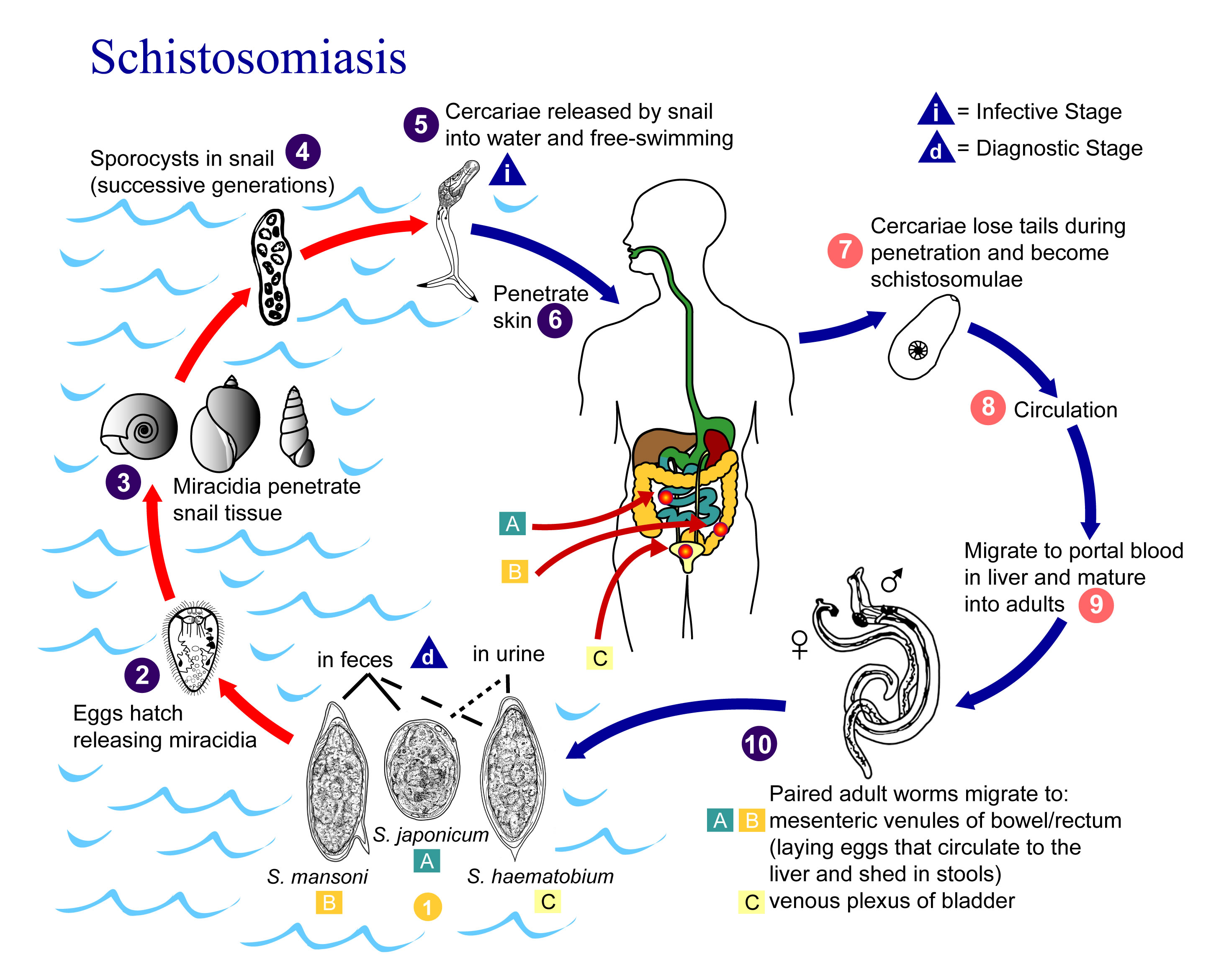
Schistosomiasis life cycle. Source: CDC

A Schistosomiasis vaccine is a vaccine against Schistosomiasis (also known as bilharzia, bilharziosis or snail fever), a parasitic disease caused by several species of fluke of the genus Schistosoma. No effective vaccine for the disease exists yet. Schistosomiasis affects over 200 million people worldwide, mainly in rural agricultural and peri-urban areas of the third world, and approximately 10% suffer severe health complications from the infection. While chemotherapeutic drugs, such as praziquantel, oxamniquine and metrifonate both no longer on the market, are currently considered safe and effective for the treatment of schistosomiasis, reinfection occurs frequently following drug treatment, thus a vaccine is sought to provide long-term treatment. Additionally, experimental vaccination efforts have been successful in animal models of schistosomiasis.

Paramyosin has been proposed as a vaccine candidate.

At present Sm-p80 (calpain) is the sole schistosome vaccine candidate that has been tested for its prophylactic and antifecundity efficacy in different vaccine formulations and approaches (e.g., DNA alone, recombinant protein and prime boost) in two very different experimental animal models (mouse and baboon) of infection and disease. Sm-p80-based vaccine formulation(s) have four effects: Reduction in adult worm numbers; Reduction in egg production (complete elimination of egg induced pathology both in baboons and mice); Protection against acute schistosomiasis; Therapeutic effect on adult worms. This vaccine is now ready for human clinical trials.

Another target is Sm14.

== Research support ==
Schistosomiasis has been considered a "neglected disease" that disproportionately affects poorer localities and has received little attention from pharmaceutical companies. Support for current research efforts to develop hookworm vaccines has come from the Schistosomiasis Vaccine Initiative, a program of the Sabin Vaccine Institute in collaboration with George Washington University, the Oswaldo Cruz Foundation, the Chinese Institute of Parasitic Diseases, the Queensland Institute of Medical Research, and the London School of Hygiene and Tropical Medicine.
