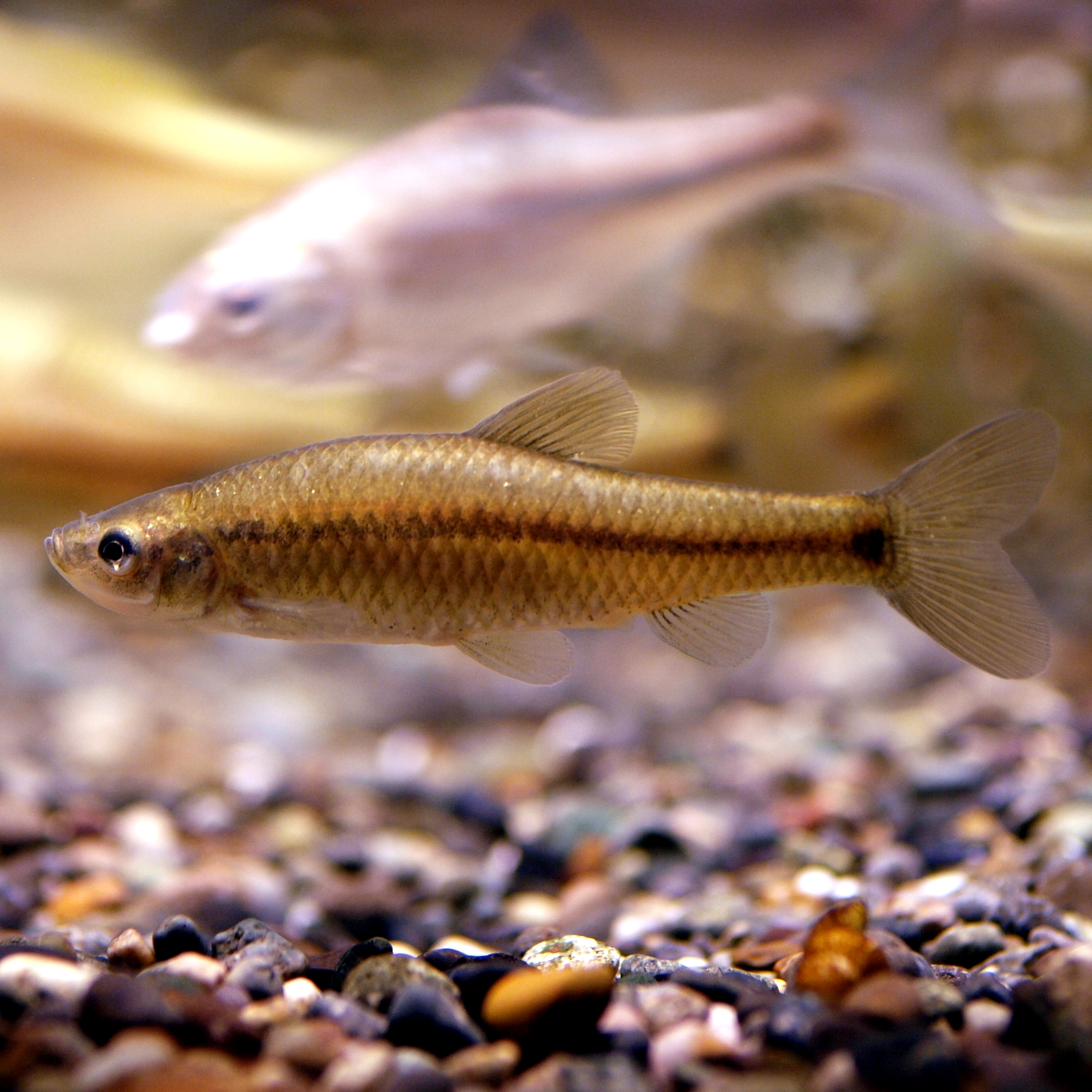

Conservation status
- Endangered (IUCN 3.1)

Scientific classification
- Kingdom: Animalia
- Phylum: Chordata
- Class: Actinopterygii
- Order: Cypriniformes
- Family: Gobionidae
- Genus: Pseudorasbora
- Species: P. pumila

Binomial name
- Pseudorasbora pumila Miyadi, 1930

= Pseudorasbora pumila =

Species of fish

Pseudorasbora pumila, also known as the moroco or Shinai topmouth gudgeon, is a species of freshwater ray-finned fish belonging to the family Gobionidae, the gudgeons. This species is endemic to northern Honshu in Japan.
