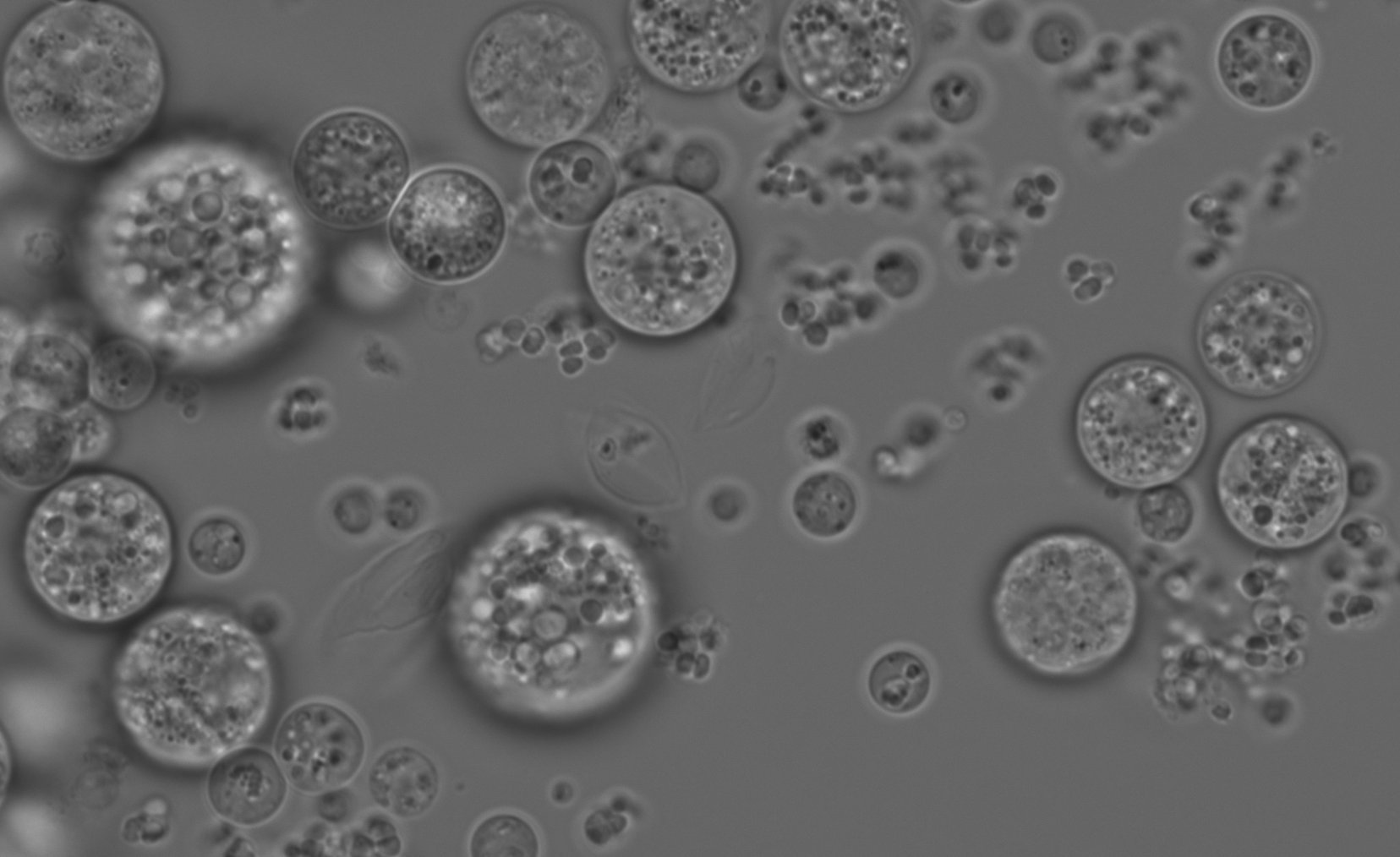

Scientific classification
- Domain: Eukaryota
- (unranked): Holozoa
- Class: Mesomycetozoea
- Order: Dermocystida
- Genus: Chromosphaera
- Species: C. perkinsii

Binomial name
- Chromosphaera perkinsii Grau-Bové, 2017

= Chromosphaera perkinsii =

Species of eukaryote

Chromosphaera perkinsii is a species of Ichthyosporea from the order Dermocystida. Named after Professor Frank Perkins, it was isolated in shallow marine sediments in Hawaii by Stuart Donachie and collaborators. It is a rare case of a putatively free-living ichthyosporean, and possibly the only free-living dermocystid. in 2024, a team from the University of Geneva observed that this species forms multicellular structures that bear striking similarities to animal embryos.
