= Diheterospora zeaspora =

Scientific classification
- Domain: Eukaryota
- Kingdom: Fungi
- Division: Ascomycota
- Class: Sordariomycetes
- Order: Hypocreales
- Family: Clavicipitaceae
- Genus: Metacordyceps
- Species: M. zeaspora

Binomial name
- Metacordyceps zeaspora G. L. Barron

Synonyms
- Rotiferophthora zeaspora

Species of fungus

Diheterospora zeaspora (also known as Rotiferophthora zeaspora) is a rare species of fungus. It parasitizes animals known as rotifers.
