= Dermocystida =

Scientific classification
- Domain: Eukaryota
- Supergroup: Amorphea
- Clade: Obazoa
- Clade: Opisthokonta
- Clade: Holozoa
- Class: Ichthyosporea
- Order: Dermocystida; Cavalier-Smith, 1998

Family
- Dermocystidiaceae

Order of parasitic eukaryotes

Dermocystida is an order of parasitic eukaryotes.

== Phylogeny ==
Borteiro et al. 2018

- Dermocystida
  - Rhinosporidiaceae
    - Sphaerothecum
    - - Dermocystidium
      - - Valentines
        - - Rhinosporidium
          - - Amphibiocystidium
            - - Dermotheca
              - Dermosporidium

== Taxonomy ==
- Family Dermocystidiaceae Goldstein 1973 [Rhinosporidiaceae Mendoza et al. 2001]
  - Genus Amphibiocystidium Pascolini et al. 2003
  - Genus Chromosphaera Grau-Bové et al. 2017
  - Genus Dermocystidium Pérez 1908 [Amphibiothecum Feldman, Wimsatt & Green, 2005; Dermocystis Pérez 1907 non Stafford 1905; Dermomycoides Granata 1919]
  - Genus Dermosporidium Carini 1940
  - Genus Dermotheca
  - Genus Rhinosporidium Minchin & Fantham 1905
  - Genus Sphaerothecum Arkush et al. 2003 (Rosette agent)
  - Genus Valentines Borteiro et al. 2018
