= Isosporiasis =

Human intestinal disease

- Other names: cystoisosporiasis
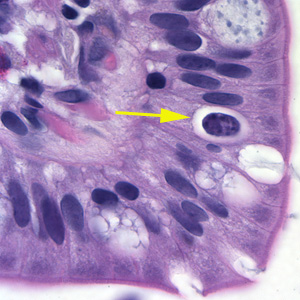
- Oocyst in epithelial cyst of mammalian host
- Specialty: Infectious disease, gastroenterology
- Symptoms: Sudden onset watery acute non-bloody diarrhea
- Risk factors: Immunosuppression
- Diagnostic method: Stool microscopy or PCR (both methods detect the oocysts)
- Prevention: Hand hygiene, avoid contaminated food and water
- Treatment: trimethoprim-sulfamethoxazole

Isosporiasis, also known as cystoisosporiasis, is a human intestinal disease caused by the parasite Cystoisospora belli (previously known as Isospora belli). It is found worldwide, especially in tropical and subtropical areas. Infection often occurs in immuno-compromised individuals, notably AIDS patients, and outbreaks have been reported in institutionalized groups in the United States. The first documented case was in 1915. It is usually spread indirectly, normally through contaminated food or water (CDC.gov).

== Signs and symptoms ==
Infection causes acute, non-bloody diarrhea with crampy abdominal pain, which can last for weeks and result in malabsorption and weight loss. In immunodepressed patients, and in infants and children, the diarrhea can be severe. Eosinophilia may be present (differently from other protozoan infections).

== Cause ==
The coccidian parasite Cystoisospora belli infects the epithelial cells of the small intestine, and is the least common of the three intestinal coccidia that infect humans (Toxoplasma, Cryptosporidium, and Cystoisospora).

=== Transmission ===
People become infected by swallowing the mature parasite; this normally occurs through the ingestion of contaminated food or water. The infected host then produces an immature form of the parasite in their feces, and when the parasite matures, it is capable of infecting its next host, via food or water containing the parasite.

=== Life cycle ===
At time of excretion, the immature oocyst usually contains one sporoblast (more rarely two). In further maturation after excretion, the sporoblast divides in two, so the oocyst now contains two sporoblasts. The sporoblasts secrete a cyst wall, thus becoming sporocysts; and the sporocysts divide twice to produce four sporozoites each. Infection occurs by ingestion of sporocyst-containing oocysts: the sporocysts excyst in the small intestine and release their sporozoites, which invade the epithelial cells and initiate schizogony. Upon rupture of the schizonts, the merozoites are released, invade new epithelial cells, and continue the cycle of asexual multiplication. Trophozoites develop into schizonts which contain multiple merozoites. After a minimum of one week, the sexual stage begins with the development of male and female gametocytes. Fertilization results in the development of oocysts that are excreted in the stool. Cystoisospora belli infects both humans and animals.

== Diagnosis ==
Microscopic demonstration of the large typically shaped oocysts is the basis for diagnosis. Because the oocysts may be passed in small amounts and intermittently, repeated stool examinations and concentration procedures are recommended. If stool examinations are negative, examination of duodenal specimens by biopsy or string test (Enterotest) may be needed. The oocysts can be visualized on wet mounts by microscopy with bright-field, differential interference contrast (DIC), and epifluorescence. They can also be stained by modified acid-fast stain.

Typical laboratory analyses include:

- Microscopy
- Morphologic comparison with other intestinal parasites
- Bench aids for Cystoisospora

== Prevention ==
Avoiding food or water that may be contaminated with stools can help prevent the infection of Cystoisospora (Isosporiasis). Good hand-washing, and personal-hygiene practices should be used as well. One should wash their hands with soap and warm water after using the toilet, changing diapers, and before handling food (CDC.gov). It is also important to teach children the importance of washing their hands, and how to properly wash their hands.

== Treatment ==
The treatment of choice is trimethoprim-sulfamethoxazole (Bactrim).

== Epidemiology ==
While isosporiasis occurs throughout the world, it is more common in tropical and subtropical areas. Cystoisospora infections are more common in individuals with compromised immune systems, such as HIV or leukemia.

== See also ==
- List of parasites (human)
