= Ungulate bocaparvovirus 1 =

Virus classification
- (unranked): Virus
- Realm: Monodnaviria
- Kingdom: Shotokuvirae
- Phylum: Cossaviricota
- Class: Quintoviricetes
- Order: Piccovirales
- Family: Parvoviridae
- Genus: Bocaparvovirus
- Species: Ungulate bocaparvovirus 1

Member virus
- Bovine parvovirus 1

Synonyms
- Bovine parvovirus

Species of virus

Ungulate bocaparvovirus 1, formerly Bovine parvovirus (BPV), also known as Haemadsorbing enteric Virus, is a member of the parvovirus group, with three significant sub-species: BPV1, 2 and 3. BPV most commonly causes diarrhea in neonatal calves and respiratory and reproductive disease in adult cattle. The distribution of the virus is worldwide. Transmission is both vertical (transplacental route) and horizontal (oro-fecal route). The virus is very resistant to chemical and physical challenges.

== Clinical signs and diagnosis ==
Diarrhea is often the only clinical sign in neonatal calves. Reproductive infection causes abortion and the birth of weak or stillborn calves. Respiratory signs such as coughing, dyspnea, and nasal discharge also can occur.

The clinical signs of BPV may be made worse by concurrent GI infections.

Immunofluorescence (IF), PCR, hemagglutination, ELISA and electron microscopy can be used to identify the virus.

Aborted fetuses are edematous and have increased pleural and peritoneal fluid. Immunofluorescence (IF) can be used to detect the virus in fetal organs. Postmortem examination of infected calves should show intestinal lesions.

== Treatment and control ==
Treatment and control is achieved by vaccination of the dams during gestation. Appropriate hygiene and disinfection methods should also be employed.

== See also ==
- Parvovirus
- Parvovirus, canine
- Parvovirus, feline
- Parvovirus, porcine
