= Human bocavirus =

Scientific classification
- (unranked): Virus
- Realm: Floreoviria
- Kingdom: Shotokuvirae
- Phylum: Cossaviricota
- Class: Quintoviricetes
- Order: Piccovirales
- Family: Parvoviridae
- Subfamily: Parvovirinae
- Genus: Bocaparvovirus

Groups included
- Member viruses: Human bocavirus-1; Human bocavirus-2; Human bocavirus-3; Human bocavirus-4

Cladistically included but traditionally excluded taxa
- All other viruses and strains in species: Primate bocaparvovirus 1; Primate bocaparvovirus 2

Bocaparvoviruses known to infect humans

Human bocavirus (HBoV) is the name given to all viruses in the genus Bocaparvovirus of virus family Parvoviridae that are known to infect humans. HBoV1 and HBoV3 (and gorilla bocaparvovirus) are members of species Primate bocaparvovirus 1 whereas viruses HBoV2 and HBoV4 belong to species Primate bocaparvovirus 2. Some of these viruses cause human disease. HBoV1 is strongly implicated in causing some cases of lower respiratory tract infection, especially in young children, and several of the viruses have been linked to gastroenteritis, although the full clinical role of this emerging infectious disease remains to be elucidated.

== History ==
Allander and colleagues at the Karolinska Institutet in Stockholm, Sweden, first cloned the coding sequence of this new member of the family of Parvoviridae in 2005 from pooled nasopharyngeal aspirates (NPA, collection of aspirated fluid from the back of the nasal cavity). They used a novel technique called molecular virus screening, based on random cloning and bioinformatical analysis. This technique has led to the discovery of new viruses such as polyomavirus KI (Karolinska Institute) and WU (Washington University), which are closely related to each other and have been isolated from respiratory secretions.

Several groups of scientists have since then found that HBoV is the fourth most common virus in respiratory samples, behind rhinoviruses, respiratory syncytial virus, and adenoviruses.

The name bocavirus is derived from bovine and canine, referring to the two known hosts for the founder members of this genus; bovine parvovirus which infects cattle, and minute virus of canines which infects dogs. Parvoviruses (Latin: small viruses) have a 5 kilobase long single-stranded DNA, and they use some of their host's replication proteins to copy their DNA.

== Virology ==
The virions are small (diameter 18–26 nanometers), icosahedral and non enveloped. The capsid has T = 1 symmetry and consists of 60 copies of coat protein. The coat proteins have a conserved, eight stranded beta barrel motif that forms the core of the capsid. There is also a conserved alpha helix.

The HBoV capsid shares three characteristic features also found in the other vertebrate parvoviruses: (1) a dimple like depression at each icosahedral 2-fold axis; (2) a large trimeric protrusion at or surrounding each 3-fold axis; (3) a cylindrical projection surrounding each 5-fold axis that encloses a central channel which connects the inside of the particle with its exterior and serves as the entry and exit portal for viral DNA. This 5-fold cylinder is itself encircled by a wide canyon like depression. While the dimple is also found among the invertebrate parvoviruses, they typically lack the 3-fold protrusions and canyon around the 5-fold channel. The external diameter of the capsid ranges from ~21.5 nanometers (nm) at the lowest points of the dimple and canyon to ~28 nm at the top of the protrusion.

The genome is a linear, single-stranded DNA 5.5 kilobases in length with disparate terminal hairpin structures at each end.

The genome encodes 3 open reading frames (ORF1, 2 and 3). The left ORF encodes 4 non structural proteins (NS1, NS2, NS3 and NS4). The middle ORF encodes NP1. The right hand ORF (ORF3) encodes the capsid proteins (VP1, VP2, and VP3). The NP1 gene is in an alternate reading frame to VP1 and overlaps the start of VP1 by 13 nucleotides. Similarly, VP3 is collinear to VP1 and VP2 and results from initiation of translation at a downstream ATG and co-terminates. VP2 is translated from a non-canonical start codon GUG.

A viral noncoding RNA of 140 nucleotides, named as bocavirus-encoded small RNA (BocaSR), is expressed from the 3' noncoding region after the VP ORF.

NP1 is a small non-structural protein that could induce apoptosis in transfection of HeLa cells.

There is a single promoter located within the 3' hairpin. This is responsible for, by alternative splicing and alternative polyadenylation, for the generation of several (at least 6) mRNAs. The poly A tail is about 150 nucleotides in length.

After nuclear import the single stranded genome is converted to double stranded DNA and production of the viral NS1 protein commences.

The genome is replicated through a unique linear rolling hairpin mechanism that is dependent on the NS1 protein. Replication has been reported to result in the creation of a series of circular head to tail sequences.

A sequence conserved among the Parvoviridae TAAAAAT is found close to the 3' terminus.

Other parvoviruses replicate only when the host cell is in S phase: viral replication results in the death of the host cell. This pattern has not yet been experimentally confirmed for the bocaviruses but seems likely to be the case. Expression of the viral proteins alone does not cause host cell death unlike other parvoviruses where this has been examined.

== Molecular biology ==
Parvoviral rolling hairpin replication is a linear adaptation of the rolling-circle replication (RCR) mechanisms used by many small plasmids and viruses. NS1, the multifunctional viral replication initiation protein, forms an oligomeric multidomain molecule that has both site- and strand-specific HuH endonuclease and superfamily III (SF3) helicase activity. All SF3 helicases travel along DNA in a 3′-to-5′ direction. Four conserved sequence motifs are found in SF3 helicases (A, B, B′, and C). These motifs form the nucleoside triphosphate binding pocket, the metal ion coordination site, the DNA-binding site and the sensory element. These motifs are in a stretch of approximately 100 amino acid residues in the middle of NS1. These helicases surround DNA as a ring of six or eight subunits with the ATP binding pocket lying between adjacent subunits. The first subunit provides the A and B motifs, and the arginine residue of the second subunit functions as a trans-acting arginine finger sensor for ATP binding and hydrolysis status. The arginine finger lies after the C motif but in three dimensions it is often embedded in a cluster of positively charged amino acids. In a ring configuration this domain interacts with the ATP binding pocket of the neighboring subunit.

The atomic structure of the HuH endonuclease domain of HBoV1 NS1 closely resembles the nickase structures encoded by other parvoviruses and by more-distant RCR replicons. This structure also mediates site-specific duplex DNA-recognition, which allows NS1 to bind site-specifically to viral replication origins positioned at each end of its genome (derived from the sequences of the viral hairpin telomeres). Origin recognition, which for some parvoviruses must be enhanced by the binding of additional cellular cofactors, leads to strand- and site-specific nicking of viral duplex DNA replication intermediates, processes that require ATP for tight binding and subsequent nicking. The NS1 protein remains covalently linked to the 5′ end of nicked DNA, while the new 3′-hydroxyl group is able to prime synthesis of additional linear sequences. Replication of the genome is thought to be mediated by DNA repair DNA polymerases. This process involves the single strand-binding protein replication protein A and NS1. In this process, NS1 acts as an ATP powered helicase to resolve terminal hairpin structures of the viral genome.

NS1 is also responsible for the cytopathic effect of some parvoviruses, and there is evidence to indicate that some form of this protein associates with one of the 5-fold cylinders of newly assembled capsids where it serves as a molecular motor, using its 3'-to-5' helicase activity to drive the encapsidation of progeny single stranded DNA into the particle.

== Genetics ==
There are four known human genotypes of this virus: type 1 to 4. Types 1 and 2 appear to have diverged recently (circa 1985) The estimated mean evolutionary rate is 8.6×10^{−4} substitutions/site/year. The 1st + 2nd codon positions evolve 15 times more slowly than those of the 3rd codon position.

There is 78%, 67%, and 80% identity between Human Bocavirus 1 and 2 NS1, NP1, and VP1/VP2 proteins respectively. Recombination may occur between strains. Human bocavirus 3 appears to be a recombinant of human bocavirus 1 and a common ancestor of human bocaviruses 2 and 4.

Bocaviruses have been isolated from pigs. Phylogenetic analysis of swine bocavirus places it with canine minute virus.

Incomplete sequences of bocaviruses have been obtained from wild chimpanzees. These sequences phylogenetically lie within the known human bocavirus isolates but also show evidence of recombination.

== Clinical ==
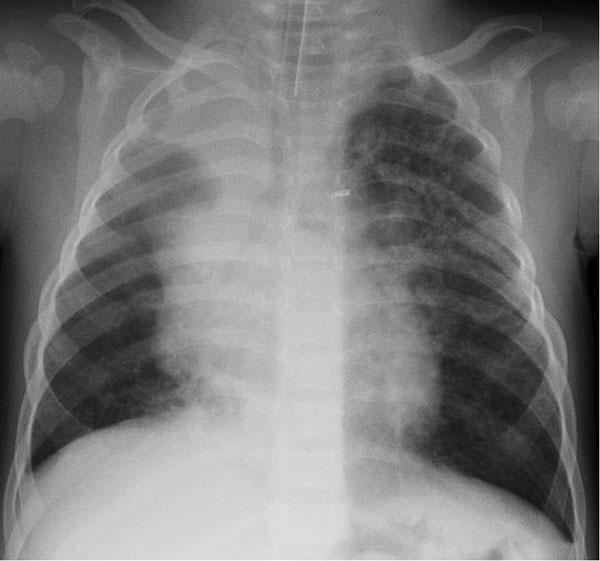
Chest radiograph of a 16-month-old boy in Finland with human bocavirus 1 pneumonia, on day 2 of hospitalization. Bilateral pulmonary infiltrations and atelectasis of the upper right lobe can be seen.

HBoV is found in respiratory samples from healthy subjects. In patients with respiratory complaints, it can be found alone or, more often, in combination with other viruses known to cause respiratory complaints. Newborns are probably protected by passive immunization. The age group most frequently affected appear to be children between the ages of six months to two years, although cases in children older than five and even in a 28-year-old have been reported.

HBoV can be detected not only in respiratory samples but also in blood, urine, and stools. The latter two may merely reflect viral shedding, although diarrhea has been described in animal bocaviral infections, and some patients with HBoV seem to have diarrhea independent of respiratory symptoms.

A study in Jordan found that 9% of 220 children hospitalized with lower respiratory tract infection were infected with bocavirus. Of those infected the median age was 4 months. Coughing (100%), wheezing (82.7%) and fever (68.2%) were the most common clinical findings with bronchopneumonia (35%) and bronchiolitis (30%) being the most common ultimate diagnoses.

HBoV1 has been generally associated with respiratory symptoms while other HBoV types tend to be associated with diarrhea and acute flaccid paralysis.

Although most cases are mild, severe respiratory disease has also been reported.

Life-threatening infection caused by human bocavirus was described in previously healthy 20-months old prematurely born child.
