= Bocaparvovirus =

Virus classification
- (unranked): Virus
- Realm: Monodnaviria
- Kingdom: Shotokuvirae
- Phylum: Cossaviricota
- Class: Quintoviricetes
- Order: Piccovirales
- Family: Parvoviridae
- Subfamily: Parvovirinae
- Genus: Bocaparvovirus

Species
- see text

Genus of viruses

Bocaparvovirus is a genus of viruses in the subfamily Parvovirinae of the virus family Parvoviridae. Humans, cattle, and dogs serve as natural hosts. There are 36 species in this genus. Diseases associated with this genus include, in humans, acute respiratory illness, and in cattle, diarrhea and mild respiratory symptoms.

== History ==
Bocaviruses were first described in animals in the early 1960s.

== Genome ==
Like the other members of this family, bocaparvoviruses have two open reading frames—ORF1 and 2. Unique among parvoviruses, the bocaparvoviruses contain a third open reading frame between non-structural and structural coding regions. This gene encodes a highly phosphorylated nonstructural protein (NP1).

ORF1 encodes a nonstructural protein (NS1) that is involved in viral genome replication. ORF2 encodes the two capsid proteins—VP1 and VP2.

Like other parvoviruses, the VP1 unique region contains a phospholipase A(2) motif with a conserved Histidine–Aspartic acid-XXY motif in the catalytic center.

== Taxonomy ==
The genus contains the following species, listed by scientific name and followed by the exemplar virus of the species:

- Bocaparvovirus carnivoran1, Canine minute virus, also called Minute virus of canines
- Bocaparvovirus carnivoran2, Canine bocavirus 1
- Bocaparvovirus carnivoran3, Feline bocavirus
- Bocaparvovirus carnivoran4, Feline bocaparvovirus 2
- Bocaparvovirus carnivoran5, Feline bocaparvovirus 3
- Bocaparvovirus carnivoran6, Mink bocavirus 1
- Bocaparvovirus carnivoran7, Canine bocavirus 3
- Bocaparvovirus chiropteran1, Myotis myotis bocavirus 1
- Bocaparvovirus chiropteran2, Bat bocavirus WM40
- Bocaparvovirus chiropteran3, Bat bocavirus XM30
- Bocaparvovirus chiropteran4, Miniopterus schreibersii bat bocavirus
- Bocaparvovirus chiropteran5, Rousettus leschenaultii bocaparvovirus 1
- Bocaparvovirus chiropteran6, Bat bocavirus BtBoV/CMR/2014
- Bocaparvovirus incertum1, Lupine bocavirus, also called Rabbit bocavirus
- Bocaparvovirus incertum2, ParvoviridaeDogfe322C1
- Bocaparvovirus incertum3, ParvoviridaeDogfe373C3
- Bocaparvovirus incertum4, ParvoviridaeDogfe362C9
- Bocaparvovirus lagomorph1, Rabbit bocaparvovirus
- Bocaparvovirus pinniped1, California sea lion bocavirus 1
- Bocaparvovirus pinniped2, California sea lion bocavirus 3
- Bocaparvovirus primate1, Human bocavirus 1
- Bocaparvovirus primate2, Human bocavirus 2c
- Bocaparvovirus primate3, Macaca mulatta bocaparvovirus
- Bocaparvovirus rodent1, Rat bocavirus
- Bocaparvovirus rodent2, Murine bocavirus
- Bocaparvovirus rodent3, Rodent bocavirus
- Bocaparvovirus ungulate1, Bovine parvovirus 1
- Bocaparvovirus ungulate2, Porcine bocavirus 1
- Bocaparvovirus ungulate3, Porcine bocavirus SX
- Bocaparvovirus ungulate4, Porcine bocavirus H18
- Bocaparvovirus ungulate5, Porcine bocavirus 3
- Bocaparvovirus ungulate6, Bovine bocaparvovirus 2, also called Ungulate bocaparvovirus 6
- Bocaparvovirus ungulate7, Dromedary camel bocaparvovirus 1
- Bocaparvovirus ungulate8, Dromedary camel bocaparvovirus 2
- Bocaparvovirus ungulate9, Vicugna pacos bocaparvovirus
- Bocaparvovirus ungulate10, Equine bocaparvovirus

=== Virus details ===
In Parvoviridae, species are now generally defined as a cluster of viruses that encode replication initiator proteins (called NS1) that have amino acid sequences that are at least 85% identical to those encoded by all other members of the species.

Marmots have also been identified as the hosts of novel bocaparvoviruses.

== Virology ==
Bovine bocaviruses utilise endocytosis in clathrin-coated vesicles to enter cells; they are dependent upon acidification, and appear to be associated with actin and microtubule dependency.

All bocaparvoviruses encode a novel protein called NP1 that is not present in parvoviruses from other genera. In Canine minute virus NP1 has been shown to be essential for an early step in viral replication and is also required for the read through of an internal polyadenylation site that is essential for expression of the capsid proteins.

=== Life cycle ===
Viral replication is nuclear. Entry into the host cell is achieved by attachment to host receptors, which mediates clathrin-mediated endocytosis. Replication follows the rolling-hairpin model. DNA-templated transcription, with some alternative splicing mechanism is the method of transcription. The virus exits the host cell by nuclear pore export. Humans, cattle, and dogs serve as the natural host. Transmission routes are oral and respiratory.

| Genus | Host details | Tissue tropism | Entry details | Release details | Replication site | Assembly site | Transmission |
|---|---|---|---|---|---|---|---|
| Bocaparvovirus | Humans; cows; dogs | None | Clathrin-mediated endocytosis | early release from viable cells & cell lysis | Nucleus | Nucleus | Aerosol |

== Clinical ==
These viruses generally infect the gastrointestinal and respiratory tracts. Some may cross the placenta and cause congenital infection of the fetus.

Canine minute virus, first isolated in 1967 and associated with disease in 1970, causes respiratory disease with breathing difficulty and enteritis with severe diarrhoea, spontaneous abortion of fetuses, and death of newborn puppies.

Human bocaviruses were first isolated in 2005 in Sweden. They may be able to cause hepatitis in an immunosuppressed host, and may be implicated in causing hepatic injury in pediatric patients.

Bocaparvoviruses have been isolated from human colon and lung cancers. The clinical importance of this finding—if any—remains to be seen.

The incidence of bocavirus in patients with cancer is higher than that of healthy controls.

== Structure ==
Like other parvoviruses, bocaparvoviruses have an icosahedral and round structure with T=1 symmetry. The capsid is non-enveloped, and composed of 60 copies of up to six types of capsid proteins (called VP1 through to VP6) which share a common C-terminal region. The structure of a virus-like particle composed only of VP2 protein was determined by cryogenic electron microscopy and image reconstruction. The diameter is around 21-22 nm. Genomes are linear, around 5.5kb in length

| Genus | Structure | Symmetry | Capsid | Genomic arrangement | Genomic segmentation |
|---|---|---|---|---|---|
| Bocaparvovirus | Icosahedral | T=1 | Non-enveloped | Linear | None |
