= National Institute of Parasitic Diseases =

Chinese government institution

The National Institute of Parasitic Diseases (Shanghai, China) is an institution within the Chinese Center for Disease Control and Prevention, which contains:

- The Department of Schistosomiasis
- The Department of Malaria
- The Department of Leishmaniasis, Filariasis and Echinococcosis
- The Editorial Department of Chinese Journal of Parasitology and Parasitic Diseases and International Journal of Medical Parasitic Diseases, a health education center

The precursor of National Institute of Parasitic Diseases is the East China Branch of the National Institute of Health, established in Nanjing in 1950. And then it was part of the Chinese Academy of Medical Sciences in 1956.
