= Charles Morley Wenyon =

English protozoologist

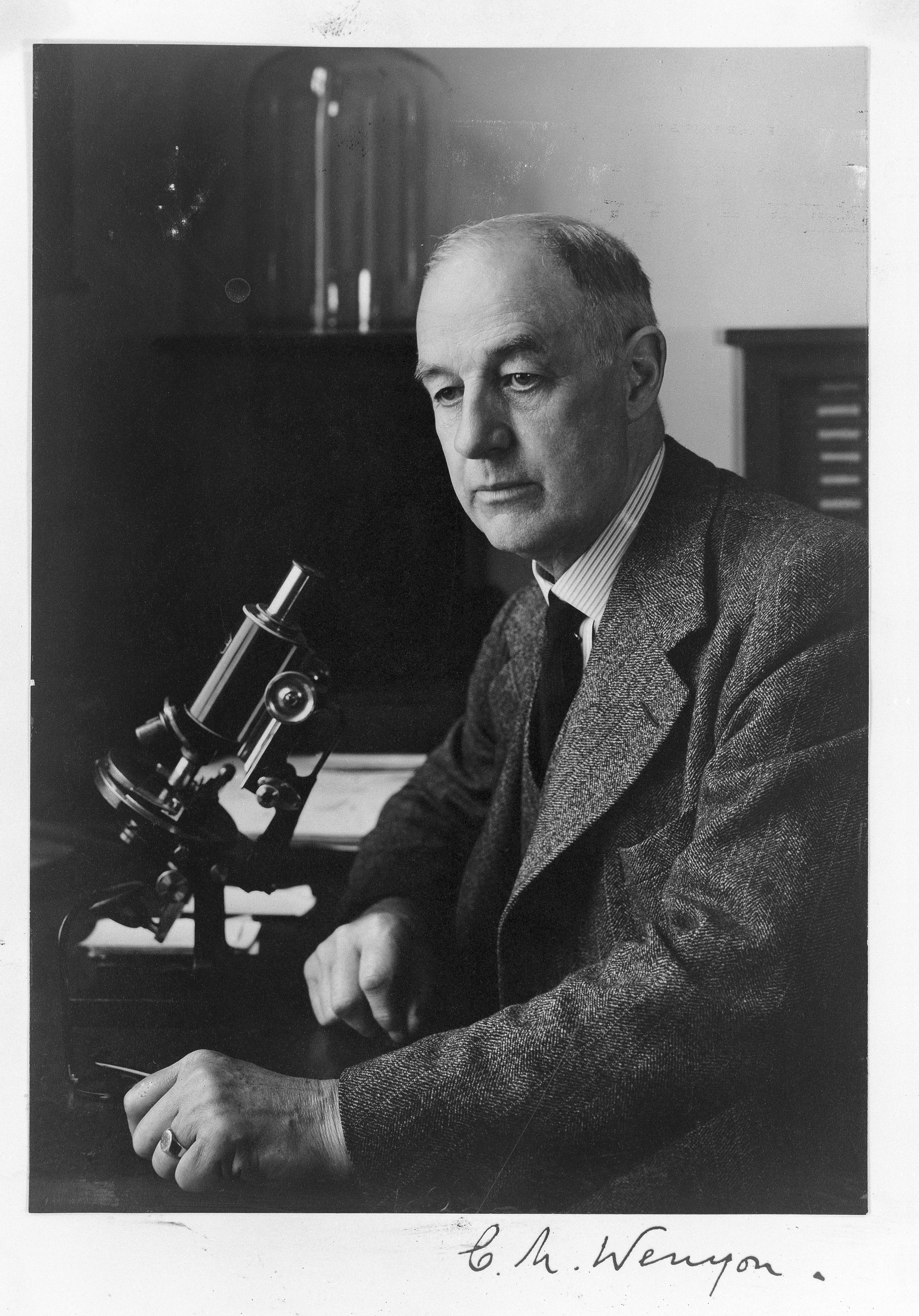
Charles Morley Wenyon

Charles Morley Wenyon CMG CBE FRS FRSM (1878–1948) was a distinguished English protozoologist.

== Biography ==
Wenyon was born on 24 March 1878 in Liverpool, to Eliza Morley (née Gittins) and Charles Wenyon, a medical doctor and missionary. In 1880, the family moved to Fatshan in China. He was educated at Kingswood School, Bath from 1892, and studied zoology and physiology at Yorkshire College, Leeds, and then at University College, London, graduating in 1901. His medical degree (1904) was from Guy's Hospital.

He briefly had a practice in Camberwell but in 1905 became head of the new protozoological department of the London School of Tropical Medicine. During his time there, he studied protozoology at the Pasteur Institute, Paris (with Félix Mesnil) and the Zoological Institute, Munich (with Richard Hertwig). He spent a year in the Sudan in 1907–8, attached to the Gordon Memorial College, Khartoum, as well as visiting Iraq (1910), Syria (1911) and Malta (1913). Much of his research in this period was on leishmaniasis.

In 1914 he joined the Wellcome Bureau of Scientific Research, London, as director of research in the tropics. During the First World War, he joined the Medical Advisory Committee in the Near East, with which he travelled to Egypt, India and Mesopotamia in 1916 and 1917, researching dysentery. He then researched malaria in Salonika, Macedonia (1917–19) and the Caucasus (1920). Returning to London, he became director of the Wellcome Bureau in 1924 and then head of the Wellcome Research Institution and research director of the Wellcome Foundation from 1932 until 1944. He continued to research in retirement.

In 1926, he published the two-volume textbook, Protozoology, a "standard work" in the field, according to his obituarist in The Times, and was editor of the Kala-Azar Bulletin. He served as president of the Royal Society of Tropical Medicine and Hygiene in 1945–47, after being joint honorary secretary from 1920.

He was twice married, with two daughters and a son. He died in London on 24 October 1948, from heart failure.

== Honours and prizes ==
Wenyon was awarded many honours and prizes for his work during his lifetime including:

- The Makdougall-Brisbane Prize of the Royal Society of Edinburgh in 1927
- The Mary Kingsley Medal of the Liverpool School of Tropical Medicine in 1929
- Officier de la Legion d'Honneur in 1933
- Elected Honorary Member of the Société Belge de Médecine Tropicale in 1934
- Honorary Life Member of the New York Academy of Sciences in 1945
- The Theobald Smith Gold Medal of the American Academy of Tropical Medicine in 1946
- Elected Honorary Fellow of the Royal Society of Medicine and Honorary Member of the Société de Pathologie Exotique in 1947
- Manson Medal of the Royal Society of Tropical Medicine and Hygiene
