= Dermocystidium =

Scientific classification
- Domain: Eukaryota
- (unranked): Holozoa
- Class: Ichthyosporea
- Order: Dermocystida
- Family: Dermocystidiaceae
- Genus: Dermocystidium Pérez 1908

Type species
- Dermocystidium pusulum (Pérez 1907) Pérez 1908

Species
- See text

Synonyms
- Amphibiothecum Feldman, Wimsatt & Green 2005; Dermocystis Pérez 1907 non Stafford 1905; Dermomycoides Granata 1919

Genus of parasitic eukaryotes

Dermocystidium is a genus of cyst-forming, eukaryotic fish parasites, the causative agents of dermocystidiosis.

== Taxonomic history ==
The genus Dermocystidium was described in 1907. It was previously thought to be a genus of fungal parasites, related to the Thraustochytrida and Labyrinthulida (both those groups are now considered to be stramenopiles rather than fungi). Other biologists considered it to be a sporozoan protist.

It was subsequently identified as one of a group of fish parasites (the "DRIP clade") of previously uncertain affiliation, which were later identified as nonanimal, nonfungal opisthokonts, and renamed as Ichthyosporea, and after expansion as Mesomycetozoa. Parasites of crustacea (Dermocystidium daphniae) and molluscs (Dermocystidium marinum) placed in this genus have been found to be likely a bacterium and an alveolate, respectively: Sayre, Gherna and Wergin (1983) concluded that Dermocystidium daphniae was likely identical to Pasteuria ramosa Metchnikoff, 1888, while D. marinum has been reclassified as Perkinsus marinus.

The frog parasite Dermocystidium ranae has been segregated as Amphibiocystidium ranae.

== Species ==
- Dermocystidium aegyptiacus El-Mansy 2008
- Dermocystidium anguillae Spangenberg 1975— a gill parasite of eels
- Dermocystidium branchialis Léger 1914 — a gill parasite of salmonids
- Dermocystidium cochliopodii Valkanov 1967
- Dermocystidium cyprini Červinka & Lom 1974 — a gill parasite of carp
- Dermocystidium erschowii Garkavi, Denisov & Afanas'ev 1980— a skin parasite of carp
- Dermocystidium fennicum Pekkarinen et al. 2003— a skin parasite of perch
- Dermocystidium gasterostei Elkan 1962 — a parasite of sticklebacks
- Dermocystidium granulosum Sterba & Naumann 1970
- Dermocystidium guyenotii Thélin 1955
- Dermocystidium koi Hoshina & Sahara 1950 — a skin parasite of carp
- Dermocystidium kwangtungensis
- Dermocystidium macrophagi van de Moer, Manier & Bouix 1988
- Dermocystidium nemachili
- Dermocystidium penneri (Jay & Pohley 1981) Borteiro et al. 2018
- Dermocystidium percae Reichenbach-Klinke 1950 — a skin parasite of perch
- Dermocystidium pusulum (Pérez 1907) Pérez 1908
- Dermocystidium salmonis — a gill parasite of salmon
- Dermocystidium sinensis
- Dermocystidium sinipercae — a parasite of Chinese perch
- Dermocystidium vejdovskyi Jírovec 1939 — a parasite of pike
