= Cangene =

Former Canadian biopharmaceutical company

Cangene Corporation
- Industry: pharmaceutical industry; contract manufacturing industry
- Founded: 1984 in Winnipeg, Manitoba, Canada
- Defunct: 2014
- Fate: Acquired by Emergent BioSolutions
- Divisions: Cangene bioPharma (CMO)

Cangene Corporation was a biopharmaceutical company based in Winnipeg, Manitoba, Canada. It was founded in 1984 and specialized in hyperimmunes, contract manufacturing, biopharmaceuticals and biodefense. Cangene was 61% owned by Canadian pharmaceutical giant Apotex and was publicly listed on the TSX under the symbol CNJ.

== Business model ==
Cangene's business model shifted several times during its existence. There is some consensus that the company came to rely on revenue from United States stockpiling and bioterrorism contracts and did not adequately prepare for the disappearance of this revenue. At one point, the company attempted a shift away from contract manufacturing to research & development, but abandoned this track after about two years and subsequently moved to marketing of ready-for-launch products developed by other companies.

== History ==
Cangene was founded in 1984 and had an employee count of 650 in 2004. In 2009, the number of personnel in the Winnipeg facilities alone was 550, with another 100 in Cangene bioPharma, 35 in its sales force, and about 100 across its plasma collection facilities. By the end of 2011, the overall number of employees was about 700, but significant cuts in personnel were conducted early in 2012. Such cuts were a continuation of a set of personnel reductions which began in mid-2010.

In 2010, Cangene obtained United States distribution rights for WinRho from Baxter, which had held them since 2005. This was in part to counter declining sales of the product under Baxter, but also as part of the corporate strategy, which called for development its own IVIG product. As both WinRho and the newly conceived product were dependent upon human plasma as source material, Cangene expanded their plasma collection facilities in 2010.

Development of the new IVIG product was subsequently cancelled in 2012, representing a strategic turn away from R&D toward marketing in an attempt to return to profitability. Decline in profitability had come in part due to decreased cash flow from a US$500,000,000 bioterrorism-related program of work with the U.S. Biomedical Advanced Research and Development Authority.

In 2012, the company obtained exclusive United States distribution rights for Episil.

In 2013, the company purchased rights to development and commercialization of three drug candidates, recombinant blood clotting factors VIIa, VIII and IX, the latter of which is in clinical trials.

In February 2014, the company was acquired by Emergent BioSolutions.

=== Corporate governance ===
As of 2010, Paul Brisebois served as the company's vice president for commercial development. At the time, the company was in the process of expanding its sales force and shifting focus from contract manufacturing to a "strategy to optimize our commercial assets."

In 2011, the company's "longtime CEO", John Langstaff of Winnipeg, resigned and leadership went to John Sedor of Philadelphia as president and CEO.

== Operations ==
Cangene's two manufacturing and plasma collection facilities were located in Winnipeg, Manitoba, Canada. The contract manufacturing subdivision, Celegene bioPharma, maintains facilities in Baltimore, Maryland, United States. The sales and marketing office was located in Philadelphia, Pennsylvania, United States. Most of the company's senior leadership were also based in Philadelphia by the time the company was sold in early 2014.

== Products ==
As a result of their biodefense focus, Cangene had three products included in the U.S. Strategic National Stockpile: Heptavalent botulism antitoxin, Vaccinia immune globulin, Anthrax immune globulin. 2012 revenue from the biodefense products amounted to US$50,000,000. Cangene also had four approved commercial specialty products: WinRho, HepaGam B, VARIZIG, and episil. 2012 commercial product revenue was US$44,000,000, while their contract manufacturing revenue was US$33,000,000.

== Cangene bioPharma ==
Cangene bioPharma is the Baltimore-based contract manufacturing division of Cangene. As of November 2010, Cangen bioPharma had 100 employees in two facilities, and 30 customers.

From May 2008 to at least November 2010, Cangene bioPharma supplied assembled Fusilev product to Spectrum Pharmaceuticals under a supply agreement. The agreement was slated to end in May 2013.
