= Passive immunity =

Transfer of antibodies between organisms

In immunology, passive immunity is the transfer of active humoral immunity of ready-made antibodies. Passive immunity can occur naturally, when maternal antibodies are transferred to the fetus through the placenta, and it can also be induced artificially, when high levels of antibodies specific to a pathogen or toxin (obtained from humans, horses, or other animals) are transferred to non-immune persons through blood products that contain antibodies, such as in immunoglobulin therapy or antiserum therapy. Passive immunization is used when there is a high risk of infection and insufficient time for the body to develop its own immune response, or to reduce the symptoms of ongoing or immunosuppressive diseases. Passive immunization can be provided when people cannot synthesize antibodies, and when they have been exposed to a disease that they do not have immunity against.

== Naturally acquired ==
=== Maternal passive immunity ===
Maternal passive immunity is a type of naturally acquired passive immunity, and refers to antibody-mediated immunity conveyed to a fetus or infant by its mother. Naturally acquired passive immunity can be provided during pregnancy, and through breastfeeding. In humans, maternal antibodies (MatAb) are passed through the placenta to the fetus by an FcRn receptor on placental cells. This occurs predominately during the third trimester of pregnancy, and thus is often reduced in babies born prematurely. Immunoglobulin G (IgG) is the only antibody isotype that can pass through the human placenta, and is the most common antibody of the five types of antibodies found in the body. IgG antibodies protects against bacterial and viral infections in fetuses. Immunization is often required shortly following birth to prevent diseases in newborns such as tuberculosis, hepatitis B, polio, and pertussis, however, maternal IgG can inhibit the induction of protective vaccine responses throughout the first year of life. This effect is usually overcome by secondary responses to booster immunization. Maternal antibodies protect against some diseases, such as measles, rubella, and tetanus, more effectively than against others, such as polio and pertussis. Maternal passive immunity offers immediate protection, though protection mediated by maternal IgG typically only lasts up to a year.

Passive immunity is also provided through colostrum and breast milk, which contain IgA antibodies that are transferred to the gut of the infant, providing local protection against disease causing bacteria and viruses until the newborn can synthesize its own antibodies. Protection mediated by IgA is dependent on the length of time that an infant is breastfed, which is one of the reasons the World Health Organization recommends breastfeeding for at least the first two years of life.

Other species besides humans transfer maternal antibodies before birth, including primates and lagomorphs (which includes rabbits and hares). In some of these species IgM can be transferred across the placenta as well as IgG. All other mammalian species predominantly or solely transfer maternal antibodies after birth through milk. In species such as cows, young calves neonatal gut is able to absorb IgG for hours to days after birth. However, after a period of time the neonate can no longer absorb maternal IgG through their gut, an event that is referred to as "gut closure". If a neonatal animal does not receive an adequate amount of colostrum before intestinal closure, it will lack sufficient maternal immunoglobulin G (IgG) in its bloodstream to protect against common infectious diseases. This condition is known as failure of passive transfer (FPT), which occurs when neonatal animals fail to absorb an adequate number of maternal immunoglobulins, primarily immunoglobulin G (IgG), from colostrum before intestinal closure. Foals are particularly susceptible; if they have low antibody levels, a veterinarian can assess their passive transfer status by measuring serum IgG concentrations, ideally between 8 and 12 hours after birth. If IgG levels are found to be low, antibodies should be administered, preferably in the form of fresh or frozen colostrum within the first 12 to 18 hours of life to ensure adequate immune protection. After gut closure, intravenous plasma or immunoglobulin therapy is recommended to restore immune function. In piglets, colostrum quality and intake significantly affect survival rates and serum IgG concentrations. Failure to treat FPT increases susceptibility to bacterial infections, diarrhea, and respiratory disease, resulting in higher neonatal morbidity and mortality.

Blood test to measure foals antibody level
IgG levels	Significance	
< 200 mg/dL of plasma antibodies	Complete FPT	X
200 – 800 mg/ dL	Partial FPT	X
> 800 mg / dL	Successful passive transfer	Yes

After gut closure, intravenous plasma or immunoglobulin therapy is recommended to restore immune function. In piglets, for example, colostrum quality and intake significantly affect survival rates and serum IgG concentrations. Failure to treat FPT increases susceptibility to bacterial infections, diarrhea, and respiratory disease, resulting in higher neonatal morbidity and mortality.

=== Other ===
A preprint suggested that (SARS-CoV-2) antibodies in or transmitted through the air are an unrecognized mechanism by which, transferred, passive immune protection occurs.

Antibodies from vaccination can be present in saliva and thereby may have utility in preventing infection.

== Artificially acquired ==
Artificially acquired passive immunity is a short-term immunization achieved by the transfer of antibodies, which can be administered in several forms; as human or animal blood plasma or serum, as pooled human immunoglobulin for intravenous (IVIG) or intramuscular (IG) use, as high-titer human IVIG or IG from immunized donors or from donors recovering from the disease, and as monoclonal antibodies (MAb). Passive transfer is used to prevent disease or used prophylactically in the case of immunodeficiency diseases, such as hypogammaglobulinemia. It is also used in the treatment of several types of acute infection, and to treat poisoning. Immunity derived from passive immunization lasts for a few weeks to three to four months. There is also a potential risk for hypersensitivity reactions, and serum sickness, especially from gamma globulin of non-human origin. Passive immunity provides immediate protection, but the body does not develop memory; therefore, the patient is at risk of being infected by the same pathogen later unless they acquire active immunity or vaccination.

=== History and applications of artificial passive immunity ===
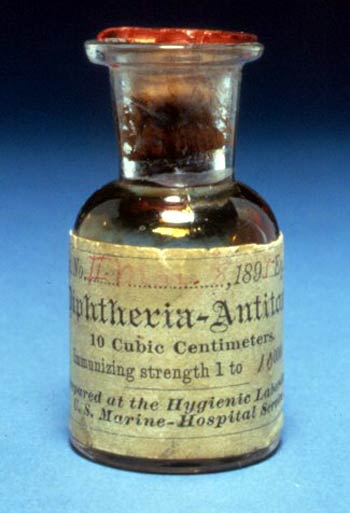
A vial of diphtheria antitoxin, dated 1895

In 1888 Emile Roux and Alexandre Yersin showed that the clinical effects of diphtheria were caused by diphtheria toxin and, following the 1890 discovery of an antitoxin-based immunity to diphtheria and tetanus by Emil Adolf von Behring and Kitasato Shibasaburō, antitoxin became the first major success of modern therapeutic immunology. Shibasaburo and von Behring immunized guinea pigs with the blood products from animals that had recovered from diphtheria and realized that the same process of heat treating blood products of other animals could treat humans with diphtheria. By 1896, the introduction of diphtheria antitoxin was hailed as "the most important advance of the [19th] Century in the medical treatment of acute infective disease".

Prior to the advent of vaccines and antibiotics, specific antitoxin was often the only treatment available for infections such as diphtheria and tetanus. Immunoglobulin therapy continued to be a first line therapy in the treatment of severe respiratory diseases until the 1930s, even after sulfonamides were introduced.

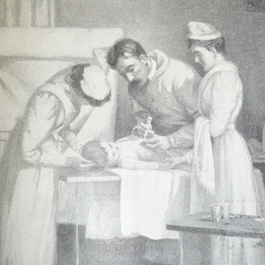
This image is from the Historical Medical Library of The College of Physicians of Philadelphia. This displays the administration of diphtheria antitoxin from horse serum to young child, dated 1895.

In 1890 antibody therapy was used to treat tetanus, when serum from immunized horses was injected into patients with severe tetanus in an attempt to neutralize the tetanus toxin, and prevent the dissemination of the disease. Since the 1960s, human tetanus immune globulin (TIG) has been used in the United States in unimmunized, vaccine-naive or incompletely immunized patients who have sustained wounds consistent with the development of tetanus. The administration of horse antitoxin remains the only specific pharmacologic treatment available for botulism. Antitoxin also known as heterologous hyperimmune serum is often also given prophylactically to individuals known to have ingested contaminated food. IVIG treatment was also used successfully to treat several patients with toxic shock syndrome, during the 1970s tampon scare.

Antibody therapy is also used to treat viral infections. In 1945, hepatitis A infections, epidemic in summer camps, were successfully prevented by immunoglobulin treatment. Similarly, hepatitis B immune globulin (HBIG) effectively prevents hepatitis B infection. Antibody prophylaxis of both hepatitis A and B has largely been supplanted by the introduction of vaccines; however, it is still indicated following exposure and prior to travel to areas of endemic infection.

In 1953, human vaccinia immunoglobulin (VIG) was used to prevent the spread of smallpox during an outbreak in Madras, India, and continues to be used to treat complications arising from smallpox vaccination. Although the prevention of measles is typically induced through vaccination, it is often treated immuno-prophylactically upon exposure. Prevention of rabies infection still requires the use of both vaccine and immunoglobulin treatments.

During a 1995 Ebola virus outbreak in the Democratic Republic of Congo, whole blood from recovering patients, and containing anti-Ebola antibodies, was used to treat eight patients, as there was no effective means of prevention, though a treatment was discovered recently in the 2013 Ebola epidemic in Africa. Only one of the eight infected patients died, compared to a typical 80% Ebola mortality, which suggested that antibody treatment may contribute to survival. Immune globulin or immunoglobulin has been used to both prevent and treat reactivation of the herpes simplex virus (HSV), varicella zoster virus, Epstein-Barr virus (EBV), and cytomegalovirus (CMV).

=== FDA licensed immunoglobulins ===
The following immunoglobulins are the immunoglobulins currently approved for use for infectious disease prophylaxis and immunotherapy, in the United States.

FDA approved products for passive immunization and immunotherapy
Disease	Product (Note: Specific or not noted: hyperimmune globulin or antitoxin. Pooled: mixed Ig from ordinary sources, also known as normal human immunoglobulin.)	Source	Use
Botulism	Specific equine IgG	horse	Treatment of wound and food borne forms of botulism.
Botulism	Despeciated equine IgG	horse	Treatment of wound and food borne forms of botulism.
Botulism	Human specific IgG	human	Treatment of infant botulism types A and B; brand name "BabyBIG".
Cytomegalovirus (CMV)	hyperimmune IVIG	human	Prophylaxis, used most often in kidney transplant patients.
Diphtheria	Specific equine IgG	horse	Treatment of diphtheria infection.
Hepatitis B	Hepatitis B Ig	human	Post-exposure prophylaxis, prevention in high-risk infants (administered with Hepatitis B vaccine).
Hepatitis A, measles	Pooled human Ig	human serum	Prevention of Hepatitis A and measles infection, treatment of congenital or acquired immunodeficiency.
ITP, Kawasaki disease, IgG deficiency	Pooled human IgG	human serum	Treatment of ITP and Kawasaki disease, prevention/treatment of opportunistic infection with IgG deficiency.
Rabies	Rabies Ig	human	Post-exposure prophylaxis (administered with rabies vaccine).
Tetanus	Tetanus Ig	human	Treatment of tetanus infection.
Vaccinia	Vaccinia Ig	human	Treatment of progressive vaccinia infection including eczema and ocular forms (usually resulting from smallpox vaccination in immunocompromised individuals).
Varicella (chicken-pox)	Varicella-zoster Ig	human	Post-exposure prophylaxis in high risk individuals.
Rh disease	Rho(D) immune globulin	human	Prevention of RhD isoimmunization in Rh(D)-negative mothers

== Passive transfer of cell-mediated immunity ==
The one exception to passive humoral immunity is the passive transfer of cell-mediated immunity, also called adoptive immunization which involves the transfer of mature circulating lymphocytes. It is rarely used in humans, and requires histocompatible (matched) donors, which are often difficult to find, and carries severe risks of graft-versus-host disease. This technique has been used in humans to treat certain diseases including some types of cancer and immunodeficiency. However, this specialized form of passive immunity is most often used in a laboratory setting in the field of immunology, to transfer immunity between "congenic", or deliberately inbred mouse strains which are histocompatible.

== Advantages and disadvantages ==
Passive immunity starts working faster than vaccines do, as the patient's immune system does not need to make its own antibodies: B cells take time to activate and multiply after a vaccine is given. Passive immunity works even if an individual has an immune system disorder that prevents them from making antibodies in response to a vaccine. In addition to conferring passive immunities, breastfeeding has other lasting beneficial effects on the baby's health, such as decreased risk of allergies and obesity.

A disadvantage to passive immunity is that producing antibodies in a laboratory is expensive and difficult to do. In order to produce antibodies for infectious diseases, there is a need for possibly thousands of human donors to donate blood or immune animals' blood would be obtained for the antibodies. Patients who are immunized with the antibodies from animals may develop serum sickness due to the proteins from the immune animal and develop serious allergic reactions. Antibody treatments can be time-consuming and are given through an intravenous injection or IV, while a vaccine shot or jab is less time-consuming and has less risk of complication than an antibody treatment. Passive immunity is effective, but only lasts a short amount of time.

== See also ==
- Active immunity
- Immunity (medical)
- Antitoxin
- Immunoglobulin therapy
- Hyperimmune globulin
