= ATC code J06 =

ATC code J06 Immune sera and immunoglobulins is a therapeutic subgroup of the Anatomical Therapeutic Chemical Classification System, a system of alphanumeric codes developed by the World Health Organization (WHO) for the classification of drugs and other medical products. Subgroup J06 is part of the anatomical group J Antiinfectives for systemic use.

National versions of the ATC classification may include additional codes not present in this list, which follows the WHO version.

== J06A Immune sera ==
=== J06AA Immune sera ===
J06AA01 Diphtheria antitoxin
J06AA02 Tetanus antitoxin
J06AA03 Snake venom antiserum
J06AA04 Botulinum antitoxin
J06AA05 Gas-gangrene sera
J06AA06 Rabies serum

== J06B Immunoglobulins ==
=== J06BA Immunoglobulins, normal human ===
J06BA01 Immunoglobulins, normal human, for extravascular administration
J06BA02 Immunoglobulins, normal human, for intravascular administration

=== J06BB Specific immunoglobulins ===
J06BB01 Anti-D (rh) immunoglobulin
J06BB02 Tetanus immunoglobulin
J06BB03 Varicella/zoster immunoglobulin
J06BB04 Hepatitis B immunoglobulin
J06BB05 Rabies immunoglobulin
J06BB06 Rubella immunoglobulin
J06BB07 Vaccinia immunoglobulin
J06BB08 Staphylococcus immunoglobulin
J06BB09 Cytomegalovirus immunoglobulin
J06BB10 Diphtheria immunoglobulin
J06BB11 Hepatitis A immunoglobulin
J06BB12 Encephalitis, tick-borne immunoglobulin
J06BB13 Pertussis immunoglobulin
J06BB14 Morbilli immunoglobulin
J06BB15 Parotitis immunoglobulin
J06BB19 Anthrax immunoglobulin
J06BB30 Combinations

=== J06BC Antibacterial monoclonal antibodies ===
J06BC01 Nebacumab
J06BC02 Raxibacumab
J06BC03 Bezlotoxumab
J06BC04 Obiltoxaximab

=== J06BD Antiviral monoclonal antibodies ===
J06BD01 Palivizumab
J06BD02 Motavizumab
J06BD03 Tixagevimab and cilgavimab
J06BD04 Ansuvimab
J06BD05 Sotrovimab
J06BD06 Regdanvimab
J06BD07 Casirivimab and imdevimab
J06BD08 Nirsevimab
J06BD09 Sipavibart
J06BD10 Clesrovimab
J06BD11 Libevitug

== See also ==
- Immune sera and immunoglobulins for veterinary use are in the ATCvet group QI.
