= Immunoglobulin therapy =

Medical treatment

Clinical data
- Trade names: Flebogamma, Gammagard, Hizentra, others
- Other names: normal human immunoglobulin (HNIG), human normal immunoglobulin (HNIG)
- AHFS/Drugs.com: Monograph
- License data: US DailyMed: Immune globulin
- Pregnancy category: AU: Exempt
- Routes of administration: Intravenous, intramuscular, subcutaneous
- ATC code: J06BA01 (WHO) J06BA02 (WHO)

Legal status
- Legal status: AU: S4 (Prescription only); CA: ℞-only; US: ℞-only; EU: Rx-only; In general: ℞ (Prescription only)

Identifiers
- CAS Number: 9007-83-4
- ChemSpider: none
- UNII: 66Y330CJHS

Immunoglobulin therapy is the use of a mixture of antibodies (normal human immunoglobulin) to treat several health conditions. These conditions include primary immunodeficiency, immune thrombocytopenic purpura, chronic inflammatory demyelinating polyneuropathy, Kawasaki disease, certain cases of HIV/AIDS and measles, Guillain–Barré syndrome, capillary leak syndrome and certain other infections when a more specific immunoglobulin is not available. Depending on the formulation it can be given by injection into muscle, a vein, or under the skin. The effects last a few weeks.

Common side effects include pain at the site of injection, muscle pain, and allergic reactions. Other severe side effects include kidney problems, anaphylaxis, blood clots, and red blood cell breakdown. Use is not recommended in people with some types of IgA deficiency. Use appears to be relatively safe during pregnancy. Human immunoglobulin is made from human blood plasma. It contains antibodies against many viruses.

Human immunoglobulin therapy first occurred in the 1930s and a formulation for injection into a vein was approved for medical use in the United States in 1981. It is on the World Health Organization's List of Essential Medicines. Each formulation of the product is somewhat different. A number of specific immunoglobulin formulations are also available including for hepatitis B, rabies, tetanus, varicella infection, and Rh positive blood exposure.

== Medical uses ==
Immunoglobulin therapy is used in a variety of conditions, many of which involve decreased or abolished antibody production capabilities, which range from a complete absence of multiple types of antibodies, to IgG subclass deficiencies (usually involving IgG2 or IgG3), to other disorders in which antibodies are within a normal quantitative range, but lacking in quality – unable to respond to antigens as they normally should – resulting in an increased rate or increased severity of infections. In these situations, immunoglobulin infusions confer passive resistance to infection on their recipients by increasing the quantity/quality of IgG they possess. Immunoglobulin therapy is also used for a number of other conditions, including in many autoimmune disorders such as dermatomyositis in an attempt to decrease the severity of symptoms. Immunoglobulin therapy is also used in some treatment protocols for secondary immunodeficiencies such as human immunodeficiency virus (HIV), some autoimmune disorders (such as immune thrombocytopenia and Kawasaki disease), some neurological diseases (multifocal motor neuropathy, stiff person syndrome, multiple sclerosis and myasthenia gravis) some acute infections and some complications of organ transplantation.

Immunoglobulin therapy is especially useful in some acute infection cases such as pediatric HIV infection and is also considered the standard of treatment for some autoimmune disorders such as Guillain–Barré syndrome. The high demand which coupled with the difficulty of producing immunoglobulin in large quantities has resulted in increasing global shortages, usage limitations and rationing of immunoglobulin.

=== Australia ===
The Australian Red Cross Blood Service developed their own guidelines for the appropriate use of immunoglobulin therapy in 1997. Immunoglobulin is funded under the National Blood Supply and indications are classified as either an established or emerging therapeutic role or conditions for which immunoglobulin use is in exceptional circumstances only.

Subcutaneous immunoglobulin access programs have been developed to facilitate hospital based programs.

Human normal immunoglobulin (human immunoglobulin G) (Cutaquig) was approved for medical use in Australia in May 2021.

=== Canada ===
The National Advisory Committee on Blood and Blood Products of Canada (NAC) and Canadian Blood Services have also developed their own separate set of guidelines for the appropriate use of immunoglobulin therapy, which strongly support the use of immunoglobulin therapy in primary immunodeficiencies and some complications of HIV, while remaining silent on the issues of sepsis, multiple sclerosis, and chronic fatigue syndrome.

=== European Union ===
Brands include HyQvia (human normal immunoglobulin), Privigen (human normal immunoglobulin (IVIg)), Hizentra (human normal immunoglobulin (SCIg)), Kiovig (human normal immunoglobulin), and Flebogamma DIF (human normal immunoglobulin).

In the European Union, human normal immunoglobulin (SCIg) (Hizentra) is used in people whose blood does not contain enough antibodies (proteins that help the body to fight infections and other diseases), also known as immunoglobulins. It is used to treat the following conditions:

- primary immunodeficiency syndromes (PID, when people are born with an inability to produce enough antibodies);
- low levels of antibodies in the blood in people with chronic lymphocytic leukaemia (a cancer of a type of white blood cell) or myeloma (a cancer of another type of white blood cell) and who have frequent infections;
- low levels of antibodies in the blood in people before or after allogeneic haematopoietic stem cell transplantation (a procedure where the patient's bone marrow is cleared of cells and replaced by stem cells from a donor);
- chronic inflammatory demyelinating polyneuropathy (CIDP). In this rare disease, the immune system (the body's defence system) works abnormally and destroys the protective covering over the nerves.

It is indicated for replacement therapy in adults and children in primary immunodeficiency syndromes such as:

- congenital agammaglobulinaemia and hypogammaglobulinaemia (low levels of antibodies);
- common variable immunodeficiency;
- severe combined immunodeficiency;
- immunoglobulin-G-subclass deficiencies with recurrent infections;
- replacement therapy in myeloma or chronic lymphocytic leukaemia with severe secondary hypogammaglobulinaemia and recurrent infections.

Flebogamma DIF is indicated for the replacement therapy in adults, children and adolescents (0–18 years) in:

- primary immunodeficiency syndromes with impaired antibody production;
- hypogammaglobulinaemia (low levels of antibodies) and recurrent bacterial infections in patients with chronic lymphocytic leukaemia (a cancer of a type of white blood cell), in whom prophylactic antibiotics have failed;
- hypogammaglobulinaemia (low levels of antibodies) and recurrent bacterial infections in plateau-phase-multiple-myeloma (another cancer of a type of white blood cell) patients who failed to respond to pneumococcal immunisation;
- hypogammaglobulinaemia (low levels of antibodies) in patients after allogenic haematopoietic-stem-cell transplantation (HSCT) (when the patient receives stem cells from a matched donor to help restore the bone marrow);
- congenital acquired immune deficiency syndrome (AIDS) with recurrent bacterial infections.

and for the immunomodulation in adults, children and adolescents (0–18 years) in:

- primary immune thrombocytopenia (ITP), in patients at high risk of bleeding or prior to surgery to correct the platelet count;
- Guillain–Barré syndrome, which causes multiple inflammations of the nerves in the body;
- Kawasaki disease, which causes multiple inflammation of several organs in the body.

In February 2025, the Committee for Medicinal Products for Human Use of the European Medicines Agency adopted a positive opinion, recommending the granting of a marketing authorization for the medicinal product Deqsiga, intended for replacement therapy in people with primary or secondary immunodeficiencies and immunomodulation in people with certain autoimmune diseases. The applicant for this medicinal product is Takeda Manufacturing Austria AG. Deqsiga is a duplicate of Kiovig (human normal immunoglobulin), which was authorized in the EU in January 2006. Deqsiga and Kiovig have the same pharmaceutical form, active substance and indications, but Deqsiga contains lower levels of immunoglobulin A (IgA) and may therefore be more suitable for people with IgA deficiency who have a higher risk of hypersensitivity to immunoglobulin products that contain higher levels of IgA. Deqsiga was authorized for medical use in the European Union in May 2025.

=== United Kingdom ===
England's National Health Service recommends the routine use of immunoglobulin for a variety of conditions including primary immunodeficiencies and a number of other conditions, but recommends against the use of immunoglobulin in sepsis (unless a specific toxin has been identified), multiple sclerosis, neonatal sepsis, and pediatric HIV/AIDS.

=== United States ===
The American Academy of Allergy, Asthma, and Immunology supports the use of immunoglobulin for primary immunodeficiencies, while noting that such usage actually accounts for a minority of usage and acknowledging that immunoglobulin supplementation can be appropriately used for a number of other conditions, including neonatal sepsis (citing a sixfold decrease in mortality), considered in cases of HIV (including pediatric HIV), considered as a second line treatment in relapsing-remitting multiple sclerosis, but recommending against its use in such conditions as chronic fatigue syndrome, PANDAS (pediatric autoimmune neuropsychiatric disorders associated with streptococcal infection) until further evidence to support its use is found (though noting that it may be useful in PANDAS patients with an autoimmune component), cystic fibrosis, and a number of other conditions.

Brands include:

- Alyglo (immune globulin intravenous human-stwk)
- Anthrasil (anthrax immune globulin- human liquid)
- Asceniv (immune globulin intravenous, human-slra)
- Bivigam (immune globulin intravenous – human 10% liquid)
- Gammagard Liquid (immune globulin infusion- human injection, solution
- Gammagard Liquid ERC
- Gammagard S/D (immune globulin intravenous- human kit
- Gamunex-C, (immune globulin injection human)
- Hizentra (immune globulin subcutaneous human)
- Hyqvia (immune globulin 10 percent – human with recombinant human hyaluronidase)
- Octagam (immune globulin intravenous, human)
- Panzyga (immune globulin intravenous, human–ifas)
- Qivigy (immune globulin intravenous, human-kthm)
- Xembify (immune globulin subcutaneous, human – klhw)
- Yimmugo (immune globulin intravenous, human-dira)

== Side effects ==
Although immunoglobulin is frequently used for long periods of time and is generally considered safe, immunoglobulin therapy can have severe adverse effects, both localized and systemic. Patients who are receiving immunoglobulin and experience adverse events are sometimes recommended to take acetaminophen and diphenhydramine before their infusions to reduce the rate of adverse effects. Additional premedication may be required in some instances (especially when first getting accustomed to a new dosage), prednisone or another oral steroid. The rate of adverse reactions depends on the route of administration. The traditional intravenous immunoglobulin (IVIG) route is more likely to cause side effects, and to affect a larger part of the body, than the new subcutaneous immunoglobulin (SCIG) route.

Local side effects of immunoglobulin infusions most frequently include an injection site reaction (reddening of the skin around the injection site), itching, rash, and hives. Less serious systemic side effects to immunoglobulin infusions include an increased heart rate, hyper or hypotension, an increased body temperature, diarrhea, nausea, abdominal pain, vomiting, arthralgia or myalgia, dizziness, headache, fatigue, fever, and pain.

Serious side effects of immunoglobulin infusions in infants, children, and adults include chest discomfort or pain, myocardial infarction, tachycardia, hyponatremia, hemolysis, hemolytic anemia, thrombosis, hepatitis, anaphylaxis, backache, aseptic meningitis, acute kidney injury, hypokalemic nephropathy, pulmonary embolism, and transfusion related acute lung injury. There is also a small chance that even given the precautions taken in preparing immunoglobulin preparations, an immunoglobulin infusion may pass a virus to its recipient. Some immunoglobulin solutions also contain isohemagglutinins, which in rare circumstances can cause hemolysis by the isohemagglutinins triggering phagocytosis.

IVIG has long been known to induce a decrease in peripheral blood neutrophil count, or neutropenia in neonates, and in patients with Idiopathic Thrombocytopenic Purpura, resolving spontaneously and without complications within 48 h. Possible pathomechanisms include apoptosis/cell death due to antineutrophil antibodies with or without neutrophil migration into a storage pool outside the blood circulation.

Immunoglobulin therapy interferes with the ability of the body to produce a normal immune response to an attenuated live-virus vaccine (like MMR) for up to a year, can result in falsely elevated blood glucose levels, and can interfere with many of the IgG-based assays often used to diagnose a patient with a particular infection.

As with all blood products, IG carriers a theoretical risk of the transmission of blood-borne diseases. This used to be an issue, but no cases are known since the 21th century with improved screening and control. The process to separate IG from the rest of the blood serum also helps remove pathogens.

== Routes of administration ==
=== 1950s – intramuscular ===
After immunoglobulin therapy's discovery in 1952, weekly intramuscular injections of immunoglobulin (IMIg) were the norm until intravenous formulations (IVIg) began to be introduced in the 1980s. During the mid and late 1950s, one-time IMIg injections were a common public health response to outbreaks of polio before the widespread availability of vaccines. Intramuscular injections were extremely poorly tolerated due to their extreme pain and poor efficacy – rarely could intramuscular injections alone raise plasma immunoglobulin levels enough to make a clinically meaningful difference.

=== 1980s – intravenous ===
Intravenous formulations began to be approved in the 1980s, which represented a significant improvement over intramuscular injections, as they allowed for a sufficient amount of immunoglobulin to be injected to reach clinical efficacy, although they still had a fairly high rate of adverse effects (though the addition of stabilizing agents reduced this further). IVIG causes a peak in Ig levels at about 15 minutes after injection, followed by a steep decline in the first two days and a slower decrease then. In maintenance therapy, it may be used monthly at a high concentration.

=== 1990s – subcutaneous ===
The first description of a subcutaneous route of administration for immunoglobulin therapy dates back to 1980, but for many years subcutaneous administration was considered to be a secondary choice, only to be considered when peripheral venous access was no longer possible or tolerable.

During the late 1980s and early 1990s, it became obvious that for at least a subset of patients the systemic adverse events associated with intravenous therapy were still not easily tolerable, and more doctors began to experiment with subcutaneous immunoglobulin administration, culminating in an ad hoc clinical trial in Sweden of 3000 subcutaneous injections administered to 25 adults (most of whom had previously experienced systemic adverse effects with IMIg or IVIg), where no infusion in the ad hoc trial resulted in a severe systemic adverse reaction, and most subcutaneous injections were able to be administered in non-hospital settings, allowing for considerably more freedom for the people involved.

In the later 1990s, large-scale trials began in Europe to test the feasibility of subcutaneous immunoglobulin administration, although it was not until 2006 that the first subcutaneous-specific preparation of immunoglobulin was approved by a major regulatory agency (Vivaglobin, which was voluntarily discontinued in 2011). A number of other brand names of subcutaneous immunoglobulin have since been approved, although some small-scale studies have indicated that a particular cohort of patients with common variable immunodeficiency (CVID) may develop intolerable side effects with subcutaneous immunoglobulin (SCIg) that they do not with intravenous immunoglobulin (IVIg).

Although intravenous was the preferred route for immunoglobulin therapy for many years, in 2006, the US Food and Drug Administration (FDA) approved the first preparation of immunoglobulin that was designed exclusively for subcutaneous use.

Compared to IVIG, SCIG alows the drug to be released slowly over time from an area beneth the skin. Standard SCIG does not allow a lot of the drug to be stored under the skin, so dosing may be done daily, weekly, or biweekly. An issue with SCIG is that it takes a long time for the pump to inject the medicine. It is now known that the manual "rapid push" process produces similar results medically, so it can be used if the patient wishes to (commonly used in pediatrics). To allow more IG to be absorbed and stored under the skin, the hyaluronidase-facilitated SCIG (fSCIG) uses an enzyme to temporarily break down the hyaluronan around the injection site. It can be used once monthly.

== Mechanism of action ==
The precise mechanism by which immunoglobulin therapy suppresses harmful inflammation is likely multifactorial. For example, it has been reported that immunoglobulin therapy can block Fas-mediated cell death.

Perhaps a more popular theory is that the immunosuppressive effects of immunoglobulin therapy are mediated through IgG's Fc glycosylation. By binding to receptors on antigen presenting cells, IVIG can increase the expression of the inhibitory Fc receptor, FcgRIIB, and shorten the half-life of auto-reactive antibodies. The ability of immunoglobulin therapy to suppress pathogenic immune responses by this mechanism is dependent on the presence of a sialylated glycan at position CH2-84.4 of IgG. Specifically, de-sialylated preparations of immunoglobulin lose their therapeutic activity and the anti-inflammatory effects of IVIG can be recapitulated by administration of recombinant sialylated IgG1 Fc.

Sialylated-Fc-dependent mechanism was not reproduced in other experimental models suggesting that this mechanism is functional under a particular disease or experimental settings. On the other hand, several other mechanisms of action and the actual primary targets of immunoglobulin therapy have been reported. In particular, F(ab')2-dependent action of immunoglobulin to inhibit activation of human dendritic cells, induction of autophagy, induction of COX-2-dependent PGE-2 in human dendritic cells leading to expansion of regulatory T cells, inhibition of pathogenic Th17 responses, and induction of human basophil activation and IL-4 induction via anti-IgE autoantibodies. Some believe that immunoglobulin therapy may work via a multi-step model where the injected immunoglobulin first forms a type of immune complex in the patient. Once these immune complexes are formed, they can interact with Fc receptors on dendritic cells, which then mediate anti-inflammatory effects helping to reduce the severity of the autoimmune disease or inflammatory state.

Other proposed mechanisms include the possibility that donor antibodies may bind directly with the abnormal host antibodies, stimulating their removal; the possibility that IgG stimulates the host's complement system, leading to enhanced removal of all antibodies, including the harmful ones; and the ability of immunoglobulin to block the antibody receptors on immune cells (macrophages), leading to decreased damage by these cells, or regulation of macrophage phagocytosis. Indeed, it is becoming more clear that immunoglobulin can bind to a number of membrane receptors on T cells, B cells, and monocytes that are pertinent to autoreactivity and induction of tolerance to self.

A report stated that immunoglobulin application to activated T cells leads to their decreased ability to engage microglia. As a result of immunoglobulin treatment of T cells, the findings showed reduced levels of tumor necrosis factor-alpha and interleukin-10 in T cell-microglia co-culture. The results add to the understanding of how immunoglobulin may affect inflammation of the central nervous system in autoimmune inflammatory diseases.

== Hyperimmune globulin ==
Hyperimmune globulins or specific IGs are a class of immunoglobulins prepared in a similar way as for normal human immunoglobulin, except that the donor has high titers of antibody against a specific organism or antigen in their plasma (typically from disease recovery or repeated immunization). Some agents against which hyperimmune globulins are available include hepatitis B, rabies, tetanus toxin, varicella-zoster, etc. Administration of hyperimmune globulin provides temporary passive immunity to the patient against an agent. This is in contrast to vaccines that provide active immunity. However, vaccines take much longer to starting working. Hyperimmune globulin may have serious side effects, thus usage is taken very seriously.

The first hyper-antisera containing hyper-Igs to see widespread use were the antitoxins, back then produced by immunizing horses against specific toxins. Horses have a lot of blood and produce large amounts of Igs in a short window of time after immunization, making them ideal for the job. The horse-derived sera and globulins are considered heterologous to humans as they contain horse-specific parts. They tend to cause an anti-horse-Ig immunity in humans in the form of serum sickness; sometimes they also cause anaphylaxis. Today horse hyperimmune Igs derived from horse hyperimmune sera are still used to treat snakebite because of how fast they start producing the Igs. A process called "despeciation" removes the horse-specific Fc portion, creating globulins that are less likely to trigger an immune reaction in other animals.

In developed countries, human hyper-Igs have largely replaced horse hyper-Igs in the more common types of antitoxins such as anti-tetanus. There are also many new targets that have ever been available as human versions, such as the Rho(D) immune globulin used to prevent an Rh(D)-negative mother from developing an immune response to here Rh(D)-positive baby. Most people who donate hyper-immune Ig sign up to a program that has them become repeatedly immunized. For newer disease outbreaks for there is no treatment, the hyper-Ig may be taken directly from someone who has recently recovered, such as in a small but successful trial against the Ebola virus in 1999.

Hyperimmune plasma is used in veterinary medicine, with the very same considerations around possible side reactions from heterologous sources.

== Society and culture ==
=== Economics ===
In the United Kingdom a dose cost the NHS between £11.20 and £1,200.00 depending on the type and amount.

=== Brand names ===
As biologicals, various brand names of immunoglobulin products are not necessarily interchangeable, and care must be exercised when changing between them. Brand names of intravenous immunoglobulin formulations include Flebogamma, Gamunex, Privigen, Octagam, and Gammagard, while brand names of subcutaneous formulations include Cutaquig, Cuvitru, HyQvia, Hizentra, Gamunex-C, and Gammaked.

=== Supply issues ===
The United States is one of a handful of countries that allow plasma donors to be paid, meaning that the US supplies much of the plasma-derived medicinal products (including immunoglobulin) used across the world, including more than 50% of the European Union's supply. The Council of Europe has officially endorsed the idea of not paying for plasma donations for both ethical reasons and reasons of safety, but studies have found that relying on entirely voluntary plasma donation leads to shortages of immunoglobulin and forces member countries to import immunoglobulin from countries that do compensate donors.

In Australia, blood donation is voluntary and therefore to cope with increasing demand and to reduce the shortages of locally produced immunoglobulin, several programs have been undertaken including adopting plasma for first time blood donors, better processes for donation, plasma donor centres and encouraging current blood donors to consider plasma only donation.

== Research ==
Experimental results from a small clinical trial in humans suggested protection against the progression of Alzheimer's disease, but no such benefit was found in a subsequent phase III clinical trial. In May 2020, the US approved a phase three clinical trial on the efficacy and safety of high-concentration intravenous immune globulin therapy in severe COVID-19. Efficacy of heterologous immunoglobulin derivatives has been demonstrated in clinical trials of antivenoms for scorpion sting and for snakebite.
