= Eczema vaccinatum =

Adverse reaction to smallpox vaccine

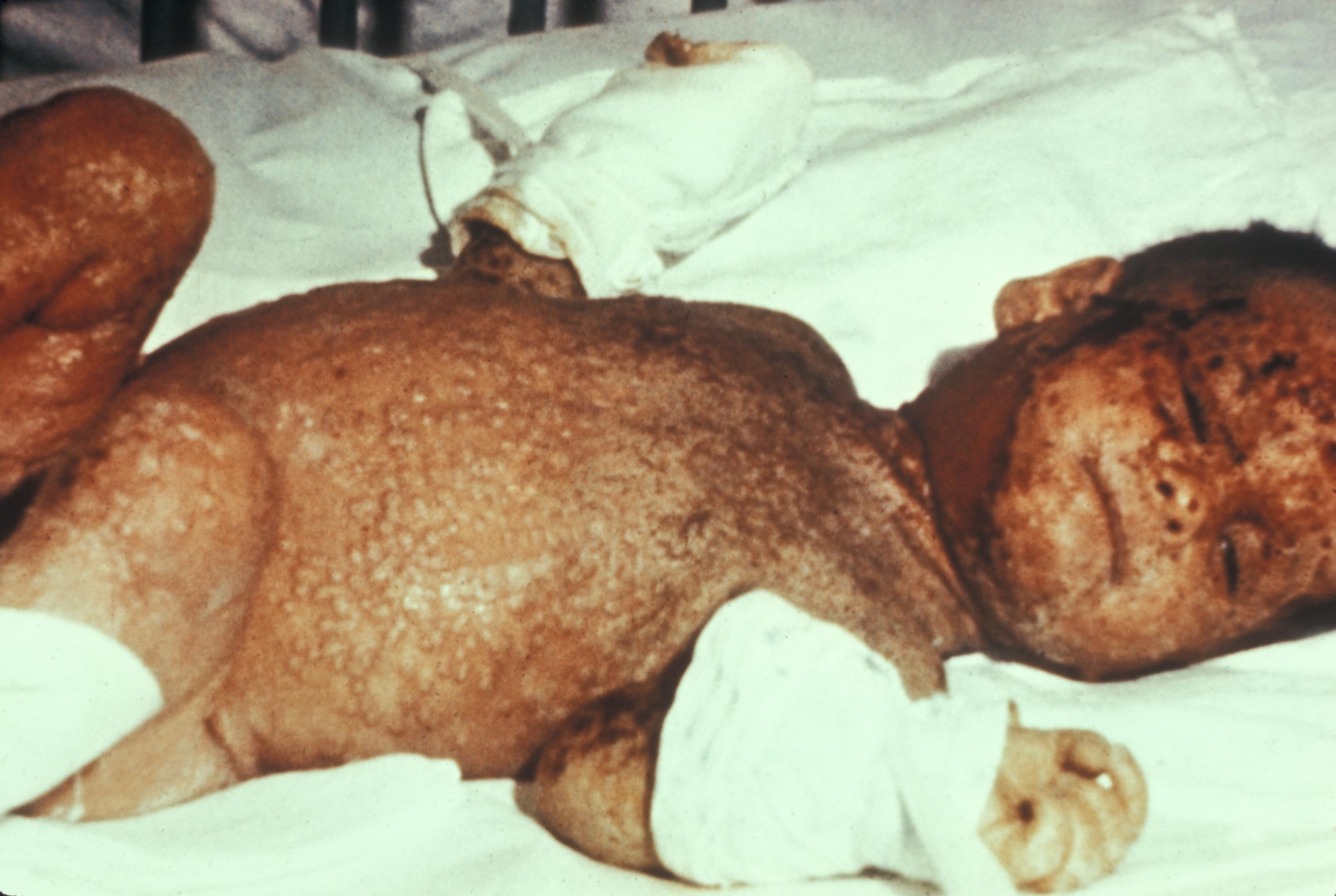
- 8 month old boy developed eczema vaccinatum after acquiring vaccinia from a sibling recently vaccinated for smallpox.
- Specialty: Infectious disease, Dermatology
- Symptoms: Severe vesicular and umbilicated skin rash, fever, facial edema, malaise, lymphadenopathy, scarring
- Complications: Airway compromise, keratitis, scarring, secondary infection
- Usual onset: 5–19 days after vaccinia exposure
- Duration: Variable
- Causes: Vaccinia virus infection in people with atopic dermatitis or eczema
- Risk factors: Past or present eczema, contact with recent smallpox vaccinee, filaggrin deficiency, young age
- Diagnostic method: Clinical presentation; confirmed by PCR or viral culture
- Differential diagnosis: Eczema herpeticum, impetigo
- Prevention: Avoid vaccinia vaccines in atopic individuals or contacts
- Treatment: Vaccinia immune globulin, antivirals (e.g., tecovirimat, cidofovir), supportive care
- Prognosis: Variable; can be fatal if untreated
- Frequency: Very rare (mainly after smallpox vaccination in atopic patients)
- Deaths: Case fatality rate 1–6% (historically); up to 30% in infants

Eczema vaccinatum is a rare severe adverse reaction to smallpox vaccination, caused by exposure to replicating live vaccinia virus.

It arises when vaccinia disseminates in people who have ever had atopic dermatitis or related eczematous disorders—or in their close contacts—because their impaired epidermal barrier permits unchecked viral spread.

== Symptoms ==
- Serious local or disseminated, umbilicated, vesicular, crusting skin rashes in the face, neck, chest, abdomen, upper limbs, and hands, caused by widespread infection of the skin in people with previously diagnosed skin conditions such as eczema or atopic dermatitis, even if the conditions are not active at the time
- Fever
- Facial and supraglottic edema
- Malaise
- Tender lymphadenopathy
- Scarring (pockmarks) in survivors

The condition may be fatal if severe and left untreated.

Older, replicating vaccinia vaccines like ACAM2000 or the historic Dryvax should not be given to patients with a history of eczema. Because of the danger of transmission of vaccinia, these also should not be given to people in close contact with anyone who has active eczema and who has not been vaccinated. People with other skin diseases (such as atopic dermatitis, burns, impetigo, or herpes zoster) also have an increased risk of contracting eczema vaccinatum. Third-generation smallpox/monkeypox vaccines currently used in public health programmes do not contain live replicating vaccinia and are therefore not subject to this warning.

== Presentation ==
The incubation period from vaccinia exposure to rash averages 5–19 days.

Because the vaccinee’s inoculation site may have crusted normally, clinicians must ask about any recent household contact with a vaccine recipient. Physical examination typically reveals hundreds to thousands of monomorphic, umbilicated papules or pustules distributed over atopic skin, accompanied by fever and tender nodes.

Mucosal or ocular involvement is infrequent but can precipitate airway compromise or keratitis, as documented in adult case reports.

=== Associations ===
Eczema is also associated with increased complications related to other vesiculating viruses such as chickenpox; this is called eczema herpeticum.

A present or past diagnosis of atopic dermatitis is the dominant risk factor, irrespective of current disease activity.

Experimental models show that Filaggrin deficiency—common in atopic dermatitis—facilitates systemic vaccinia spread, linking structural barrier genes to EV pathogenesis.

First-time vaccinees and unvaccinated household contacts lack Orthopoxvirus immunity and therefore experience the most severe illness.

Young children are disproportionately affected because both the prevalence of eczema and the risk of high-titer viraemia are greater at younger ages.

== Diagnosis ==
EV is suspected when multiple vaccinia-type lesions arise outside the vaccination site in a patient with eczema or when such lesions follow close contact with a recent vaccinee. Definitive confirmation relies on real-time PCR or culture to detect orthopoxvirus DNA from lesion material, differentiating EV from eczema herpeticum or bacterial impetigo.

CDC surveillance criteria classify EV as a diffuse dermatological complication; confirmed cases must be reported through VAERS to facilitate a public-health response.

== Treatment ==
Eczema vaccinatum is a serious medical condition that requires immediate and intensive medical care. Therapy has been supportive, such as antibiotics, fluid replacement, antipyretics and analgesics, skin healing, etc.; vaccinia immune globulin (VIG) could be very useful, but supplies may be deficient as of 2006. Severe or progressive illness unresponsive to VIGIV may be treated with anti-viral drugs, such as Cidofovir or Tecovirimat. All three agents were used successfully in the 2007 Indiana child, marking the first paediatric use of cidofovir for vaccinia.

Tecovirimat (TPOXX; ST-246) received FDA approval for smallpox in 2018 and is available under expanded-access protocols for EV, offering a targeted inhibitor with fewer renal toxicities than cidofovir.

Supportive management (fluid resuscitation, meticulous wound care, and airway protection) remains essential to reduce secondary sepsis and long-term scarring.

== 21st-century cases ==
In March 2007, a two-year-old boy and his mother in Indiana contracted the life-threatening vaccinia infection from his father, who was vaccinated against smallpox as part of the standard vaccination protocol for individuals serving in the US Armed Forces beginning in 2002. The child developed the pathognomonic rash which typifies eczema vaccinatum, over 80 percent of his body surface area. The boy has a history of eczema, which is a known risk factor for vaccinia infection.

== Fatality rate ==
Historical series place the overall case-fatality rate at 1–6 percent, rising to about 30 percent in infants under two years.

== See also ==
- List of cutaneous conditions
