= Histopathologic diagnosis of dermatitis =

Histopathology of dermatitis can be performed in uncertain cases of inflammatory skin condition that remain uncertain after history and physical examination.

== Sampling ==
Generally a skin biopsy:

- For punch biopsies, a size of 4 mm is preferred for most inflammatory dermatoses.
- Panniculitis or cutaneous lymphoproliferative disorders: 6 mm punch biopsy or skin excision.

A superficial or shave biopsy is regarded as insufficient.

== Fixation ==
- Generally: Buffered 4% formaldehyde.
- In suspected immunologic disease: Fixation for immunofluorescence, with for example Michel's solution. For details, see immunofluorescense of skin tissues

== Staining ==
Generally 3 sections for H&E staining and one section with periodic acid Schiff (PAS) (Note: PAS is for evaluation of the epidermal basement membrane, blood vessels, and the presence of fungal organisms)

- If suspected bacterial and fungal microorganisms, consider Gram stain and Gomori methenamine silver stain.

== Microscopic evaluation ==
One approach is to classify into mainly either of the following, primarily based on depth of involvement:

- Epidermis, papillary dermis, and superficial vascular plexus:

- Vesiculobullous lesions
- Pustular dermatosis
- Non vesicullobullous, non-pustular

- With epidermal changes
- Without epidermal changes. These characteristically have a superficial perivascular inflammatory infiltrate, and can be classified by type of cell infiltrate:

- Lymphocytic (most common)
- Lymphoeosinophilic
- Lymphoplasmacytic
- Mast cell
- Lymphohistiocytic
- Neutrophilic

Continue in corresponding section:

=== Non vesicullobullous, non-pustular lesions with epidermal changes ===
==== Spongiotic dermatitis ====
It is characterized by epithelial intercellular edema.

	Characteristics			Micrograph	Photograph
	Acute	Subacute	Chronic	Micrograph	Photograph
Generally/Not otherwise specified (Note: In "not otherwise specified" cases, a diagnosis may be reached by a review of the medical history and physical examination, based upon the potential conditions at hand.)	Typical findings: Variable degree of epidermal spongiosis and vesicle formation, filled with proteinaceous fluid containing lymphocytes and histiocytes.; Usually superficial dermal edema with perivascular lymphocytic infiltrate, with exocytosis.; No acanthosis or parakeratosis.	Typical findings: Mild to moderate spongiosis and exocytosis of inflammatory cells; Irregular acanthosis and parakeratosis.; Superficial dermal perivascular lymphohistiocytic infiltrate; Swelling of endothelial cells; Papillary dermal edema are present	Typical findings: The spongiosis is mild to absent; Pronounced irregular acanthosis, hyperkeratosis, and parakeratosis; Minimal dermal inflammation and exocytosis of inflammatory cells are present.; Possibly fibrosis of papillary dermis; PAS stain is essential to exclude fungal infection.	Subacute	
Allergic/contact dermatitis or atopic dermatitis	As above. Eosinophils may be present in the dermis and epidermis (eosinophilic spongiosis).			Allergic dermatitis	Atopic dermatitis
Seborrheic dermatitis	Typical findings: Focal, usually mild, spongiosis with overlying scale crust, with a few neutrophils; The crust is often centered on a follicle; The papillary dermis is generally mildly edematous; Dilated blood vessels in the superficial vascular plexus; Mild superficial perivascular infiltrate of lymphocytes, histiocytes and occasional neutrophils. There is some exocytosis of inflammatory cells but not as prominent as in nummular dermatitis	Typical findings: Psoriasiform hyperplasia, initially slight, with mild spongiosis; Usually numerous yeast-like organisms in the surface keratin; Same changes as seen in acute stage.	Typical findings: More pronounced psoriasiform hyperplasia; Only minimal spongiosis; Presence of scaling crusts in a folliculocentric distribution, distinguishes from psoriasis.		

In addition to above, an unspecific spongiotic dermatitis can be consistent with nummular dermatitis, dyshidrotic dermatitis, Id reaction, dermatophytosis, miliaria, Gianotti-Crosti syndrome and pityriasis rosea.

==== Interface dermatitis ====
These are sorted into either:

- Interface dermatitis with vacuolar change
- Interface dermatitis with lichenoid inflammation

===== Interface dermatitis with vacuolar change =====
Causes of vacuolar interface dermatitis
Main conditions	Characteristics	Micrograph	Photograph
Generally/Not otherwise specified	Typical findings, called "vacuolar interface dermatitis": Mild inflammatory cell infiltrate along the dermoepidermal junction (black arrow in image); Vacuolization within the basal keratinocytes (white arrow in image); Often necrotic, predominantly basal, individual keratinocytes, manifesting as colloid or Civatte bodies		
Acute graft-versus-host-disease	Vacuolar alteration of various severity, from focal or diffuse vacuolation of the basal keratinocytes (grade I), to separation at the dermoepidermal junction (grade III); Involvement of the hair follicle; Rarely eosinophils		
Allergic drug reaction	Rarely involvement of hair follicles.; Frequently eosinophils		
Lichen sclerosus	Hyperkeratosis, atrophic epidermis, sclerosis of dermis and dermal lymphocytes.		
Erythema multiforme			
Lupus erythematosis	Typical findings in systemic lupus erythematosus: Fibrinoid necrosis at the dermoepidermal junction; Liquefactive degeneration and atrophy of the epidermis; Mucin deposition in the reticular dermis; Edema, small hemorrhages; Mild and mainly lymphocytic infiltrate in the upper dermis; Fibrinoid material in the dermis around capillary blood vessels, on collagen and in the interstitium; In non-bullous cases, perivascular and interstitial neutrophils are sometimes present in the upper dermis, with damage to blood vessels		

An interface dermatitis with vacuolar alteration, not otherwise specified, may be caused by viral exanthems, phototoxic dermatitis, acute radiation dermatitis, erythema dyschromicum perstans, lupus erythematosus and dermatomyositis.

===== Interface dermatitis with lichenoid inflammation =====
Main conditions	Characteristics	Micrograph	Photograph
Generally/Not otherwise specified	Typical findings: In the papillary dermis: a confluent, band-like, dense inflammation of mainly small lymphocytes and a few histiocytes, along or hugging the dermoepidermal junction.; Often vacuolar degeneration of basal keratinocytes and apoptotic bodies (colloid or Civatte bodies).		
Lichen planus	Irregular epidermal hyperplasia with a jagged "sawtooth" appearance, compact hyperkeratosis or orthokeratosis, foci of wedge-shaped hypergranulosis, basilar vacuolar degeneration, slight spongiosis in the spinous layer, and squamatization. The dermal papillae between the elongated rete ridges are frequently dome shaped. Necrotic keratinocytes can be observed in the basal layer of the epidermis and at the dermal-epidermal junction. Eosinophilic remnants of anucleate apoptotic basal cells may also be found in the dermis and are referred to as "colloid or civatte bodies". Whickham striae are usually seen in the areas of hypergranulosis. Vacuolar degeneration at the basal layer may be noted leading to focal subepidermal clefts (Max Joseph spaces). Squamatization occurs as a result of maturation and flattening of cells in the basal layer. It happens in areas of marked hypergranulosis with prominence of the sawtooth pattern of rete ridges. Wedge-shaped hypergranulosis can occur in the eccrine ducts (acrosyringia) or hair follicles (acrotrichia). In the hypertrophic subtype, the associated hyperkeratosis, parakeratosis, hypergranulosis, papillomatosis, acanthosis, and hyperplasia markedly increased with thicker collagen bundles forming in the dermis. Moreover, the rete ridges are more elongated and rounded as opposed to the typical sawtooth pattern. In atrophic LP, loss of the rete ridges and dermal fibrosis is prominent. In vesiculobullous LP, the disease progression is quicker. Hence, some of the distinctive features such as hyperkeratosis, hypergranulosis, or dense lymphocytic dermal-epidermal infiltrate may not be present. LP lesion may resolve with residual hyperpigmentation caused by a persistent increase in the number of melanophages in the papillary dermis.		
Lichenoid drug reaction	Can virtually be indistinguishable from cutaneous LP both clinically and histopathologically.: Typically, lesions have a photodistribution in the absence of oral mucosal involvement.; Characteristically parakeratosis, a dermal eosinophilic infiltrate, and a perivascular lymphocytic infiltrate affecting the reticular dermis.; Epidermal changes are less common in lichenoid drug eruptions when compared to classic lichen planus. However, a higher concentration of necrotic keratinocyte and eosinophils in the infiltrate can be helpful in distinguishing lichenoid drug reaction from cutaneous lichen planus. A lengthy interval between the commencement of drug therapy and the onset of lesions does not exclude a diagnosis of lichenoid drug reaction. Resolution of the lesions often occurs within weeks to months after discontinuation of the offending drug.		
Lichen nitidus	Localized granulomatous lymphohistiocytic infiltrate in an expanded dermal papilla; Thinning of overlying epidermis and downward extension of the rete ridges at the lateral margin of the infiltrate, resulting in a typical "claw clutching a ball" appearance.		
Lichen amyloidosis	Presence of amyloid, possibly with direct immunofluorescence and Congo red staining.	Congo red.	

Interface dermatitis with lichenoid inflammation, not otherwise specified, can be caused by lichen planus-like keratosis, lichenoid actinic keratosis, lichenoid lupus erythematosus, lichenoid GVHD (chronic GVHD), pigmented purpuric dermatosis, pityriasis rosea, and pityriasis lichenoides chronica. Unusual conditions that can be associated with a lichenoid inflammatory cell infiltrate are HIV dermatitis, syphilis, mycosis fungoides, urticaria pigmentosa, and post-inflammatory hyperpigmentation. In cases of post-inflammatory hyperpigmentation, it is important to exclude potentially harmful mimics such as a regressed melanocytic lesion or lichenoid pigmented actinic keratosis.

==== Psoriaform dermatitis ====
Examining multiple deeper levels is recommended if initial cuts do not correlate well with the clinical history.

Psoriaform dermatitis typically displays:

- Regular epidermal hyperplasia, elongation of the rete ridges, hyperkeratosis, and parakeratosis.
- Usually:A superficial perivascular inflammatory infiltrate
- Often: Thinning of epidermal cells overlying the tips of dermal papillae (suprapapillary plates), and dilated, tortuous blood vessels within these papillae

Further histopathologic diagnosis is performed by the following parameters:

Psoriasiform dermatitis
Condition	Hyperkeratosis	Parakeratosis	Acanthosis	Suprapapillary plate	Granular cell layer changes	Spinous cell layer changes	Basal cell layer changes	Other distinctive feature	Micrograph	Photograph
Psoriasis	Present	Diffuse	Regular	Thin	Decreased or absent	Increased mitoses; minimal spongiosis Clubbed rete pegs	Absent	Microabscesses		
Psoriasiform drug reaction	Present	Focal	Regular and irregular	Normal or thick	Normal	Spongiosis; eosinophilic infiltrate	Inflammatory cells; Civatte bodies			
Chronic allergic/contact and atopic dermatitis	Present	Focal; crust may be present	Irregular	Normal or thick	Normal	Spongiosis; eosinophilic infiltrate	Absent			
Fungal infection	Compact	Focal; crust may be present	Irregular	Normal or thick	Normal	Occasional neutrophiles;	Absent			
Lichen simplex chronicus	Present	Focal; thick crust	Regular or irregular	Thin or thick	Thickened; hypergranulosis	±minimal inflammatory infiltrate	Absent			
Scabies	Present	Focal or diffuse	Irregular	Normal or thick	Normal	Inflammatory infiltrate; eosinophilic spongiosis	Absent			
Seborrheic dermatitis and HIV dermatitis	Present	Focal	Irregular	Normal or thick	Normal	Spongiosis; lymphocytic and neutrophilic infiltrate	Absent			
Pityriasis rubra pilaris	Compact	Shoulder parakeratosis; (Note: Parakeratotic mounds at the edge of follicular ostia.) alternating orthokeratosis and parakeratosis	Regular or irregular	Normal or thick	Normal	Spongiosis; lymphocytic infiltrate; rare acantholysis	Occasional vacuolar change			
Pityriasis rosea	Present	Focal	Irregular	Normal or thick	Normal	Small foci of spongiosis; lymphocytic infiltrate	Occasional necrotic keratinocytes			
Syphilis	Present	Focal	Regular or irregular	Normal or thick	Normal	Lymphocytes and neutrophils	Interface change			
Pityriasis lichenoides chronica	Present	Caps of parakeratosis	Irregular	Normal	Normal	Mild spongiosis, lymphocytic infiltrate; necrotic keratinocytes	Necrotic keratinocytes			
Mycosis fungoides	Present	Focal	Regular or irregular	Normal	Normal	Minimal or no spongiosis; ±Pautrier microabscess	Atypical lymphoid cells lining the dermo–epidermal junction		Pautrier microabscesses	

=== Non vesicullobullous, non-pustular lesions without epidermal changes ===
==== Lymphocytic infiltrate ====
Main conditions	Characteristics	Micrograph	Photograph
Urticaria, lymphocyte predominant	Perivascular location. Mast cells are relatively sparse, potentially demonstrated with special stains, preferably tryptase stain. Extravasated erythrocytes are present in about 50% of the cases. No vasculitis.	Dermal edema [solid arrows in (A,B)] and a sparse superficial predominantly perivascular and interstitial infiltrate of lymphocytes and eosinophils without signs of vasculitis (dashed arrow).	
Fungal skin infection	Often visible fungus. Other signs depend on fungus species.		
Pigmented purpuric dermatosis	Perivascular infiltrate, but may involve the dermis, further away from blood vessels.; Sometimes tendency for lichenoid infiltrate (Note: Pigmented purpuric dermatitis of Gougerot and Blum particularly have a tendency for lichenoid infiltrate.); Mild vascular damage, mainly endothelial swelling and focal karyorrhectic debris.; Red blood cell extravasation.; The epidermis may be normal or may exhibit spongiosis, focal parakeratosis, exocytosis and/or vacuolar change.		
Erythema annulare centrifugum	Superficial types: Mild spongiosis, parakeratosis and microvesiculation.; "Coat-sleeve anomaly": tight lymphohistiocytic infiltrate surrounding superficial vessels; Deep lesions: Sharply demarcated perivascular mononuclear cell infiltrate in middle to deep dermis		
Not otherwise specified	A lesion with superficial lymphocytic infiltrate without additional histopathologic characteristics can be due to for example drug reactions and insect bites.		

==== Lymphoeosinophilic infiltrate ====
Main conditions	Characteristics	Micrograph	Photograph
Urticaria, lymphocyte predominant	Perivascular location. Mast cells are relatively sparse, potentially demonstrated with special stains, preferably tryptase stain. Extravasated erythrocytes are present in about 50% of the cases. No vasculitis.	Dermal edema (solid arrows) and a sparse superficial predominantly perivascular and interstitial infiltrate of lymphocytes and eosinophils (dashed arrow)	
Prevesicular stage of bullous pemphigoid	Image at right shows influx of inflammatory cells including eosinophils and neutrophils in the dermis (solid arrow) and blister cavity (dashed arrows), and deposition of fibrin (asterisks). However, the diagnosis of bullous pemphigoid consist of at least 2 positive results out of 3 criteria: Pruritus and/or predominant cutaneous blisters; Linear IgG and/or C3c deposits (in an n- serrated pattern) by direct immunofluorescence microscopy (DIF); Positive epidermal side staining by indirect immunofluorescence microscopy on human salt-split skin (IIF SSS) on a serum sample.		
Not otherwise specified	A lesion with superficial lymphoeosinophilic infiltrate without additional histopathologic characteristics can be due to for example drug reactions and insect bites.		

==== Lymphoplasmacytic infiltrate ====
Main conditions	Characteristics	Micrograph	Photograph
Rosacea	Typically enlarged, dilated capillaries and venules located in the upper dermis, angulated telangiectasias, perivascular and perifollicular lymphocytic infiltration, and superficial dermal edema.		
Secondary syphilis	Various, but often one or a combination of: Psoriasiform hyperplasia with superficial neutrophils; Lichenoid tissue reaction, epidermal apoptosis and exocytosis of neutrophils; Superficial and deep chronic infiltrate in the dermis; Often numerous plasma cells in about 1/3 of cases; Often endothelial swelling.		
Erythema migrans	Typically a superficial and deep perivascular lymphocytic infiltrate. Plasma cells are typically located at the periphery of the lesion, whereas eosinophils are in the center.		
Kaposi's sarcoma in patch stage	The patch stage typically shows irregular proliferation of jagged vascular channels in the dermis below an integral epidermis. The so-called promontory sign is sometimes found in patch stage lesions and denotes vascular spaces surrounding pre-existing blood (see image). vessels		
Not otherwise specified	A lesion with superficial lymphoplasmacytic infiltrate without additional histopathologic characteristics can be due to for example trauma, ulceration, scar and early cutaneous connective tissue diseases.		

==== Mastocytosis ====
Main conditions	Characteristics	Micrograph	Photograph
Urticaria pigmentosa	Mastocytosis with a clinical picture of darkish spots.		
Not otherwise specified	Includes the rare disease of primary mastocytosis.		

==== Lymphohistiocytic infiltrate ====
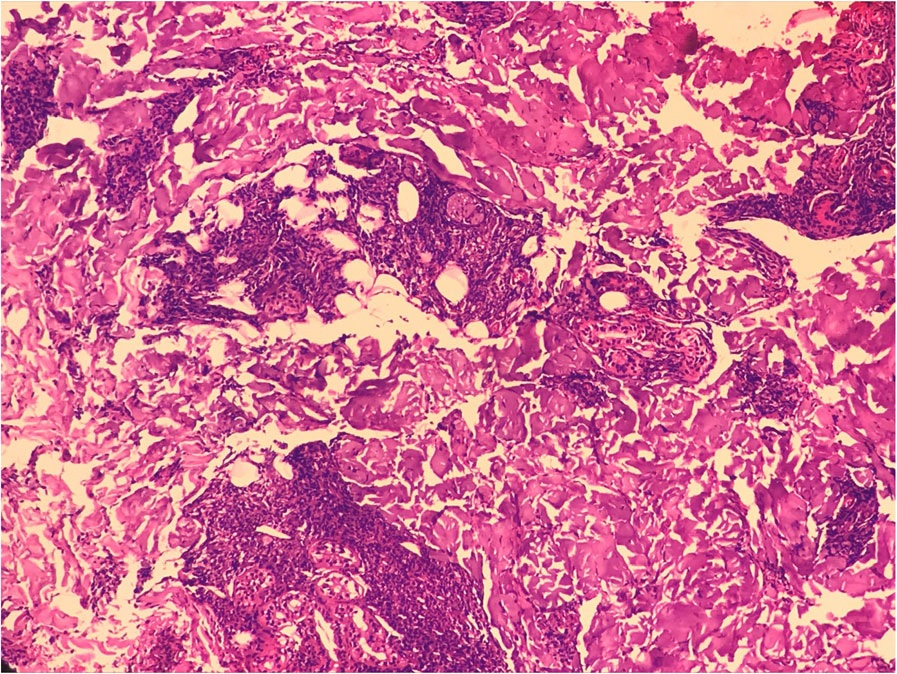
Leprosy

These include bacterial infections including leprosy, and the sample should therefore be stained with Ziel-Neelsen, acid fast stains, Gomori methenamine silver, PAS, and Fite stains. If negative, an unspecific lymphohistocytic dermatosis may be caused by drug reactions and viral infections.

==== Neutrophilic infiltrate ====
Main conditions	Characteristics	Micrograph	Photograph
Urticaria, neutrophil predominant	Interstitial location; Relatively dense infiltrate; Mast cells are relatively sparse, potentially demonstrated with special stains, preferably tryptase stain.; Extravasated erythrocytes are present in about 50% of the cases; No vasculitis.		
Dermatitis herpetiformis	Subepidermal vesicles and blisters associated with accumulation of neutrophils at the papillary tips.; Sometimes presence of eosinophils, giving an appearance similar to bullous pemphigoid.; The histopathology is unspecific in approximately 35%–40% of the cases, and direct immunofluorescence is needed, showing deposition of IgA in the papillary dermis in a granular or fibrillar pattern.		
Early linear IgA bullous dermatosis	Subepidermal blister formation.		
Early febrile neutrophilic dermatosis (Sweet's syndrome)	Neutrophilic and lymphohistiocytic infiltrate and edema.		
Connective tissue disorders	Usually associated with epidermal changes. (Systemic lupus erythematosis pictured)		
Cutaneous small-vessel vasculitis	Neutrophils with nuclear dust (dashed arrows in image), with high affinity for postcapillary venules.; Features of vascular injury: fibrinoid necrosis (asterisks) and erytrocyt extravasation (solid arrows)		

==== Multinucleated giant cells ====
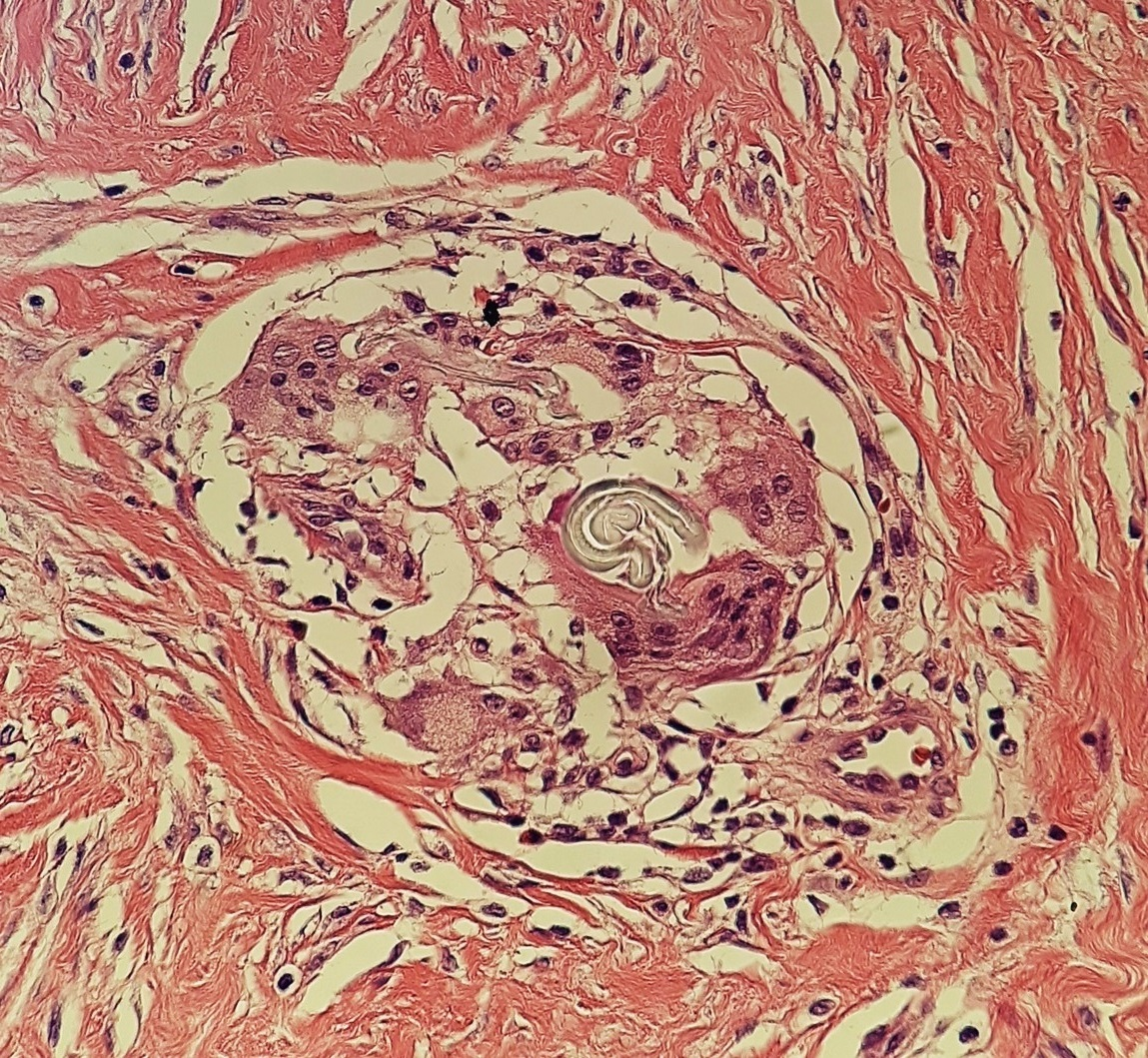
Suture granuloma, with multinucleated giant cells surrounding (grey) suture material.

- Foreign bodies indicate a foreign body granuloma.
- Specific forms of multinucleated giant cells include the Touton giant cell, which contains a ring of nuclei surrounding a central homogeneous cytoplasm, with foamy cytoplasm surrounding the nuclei. The central cytoplasm (surrounded by the nuclei) may be both amphophilic and eosinophilic.
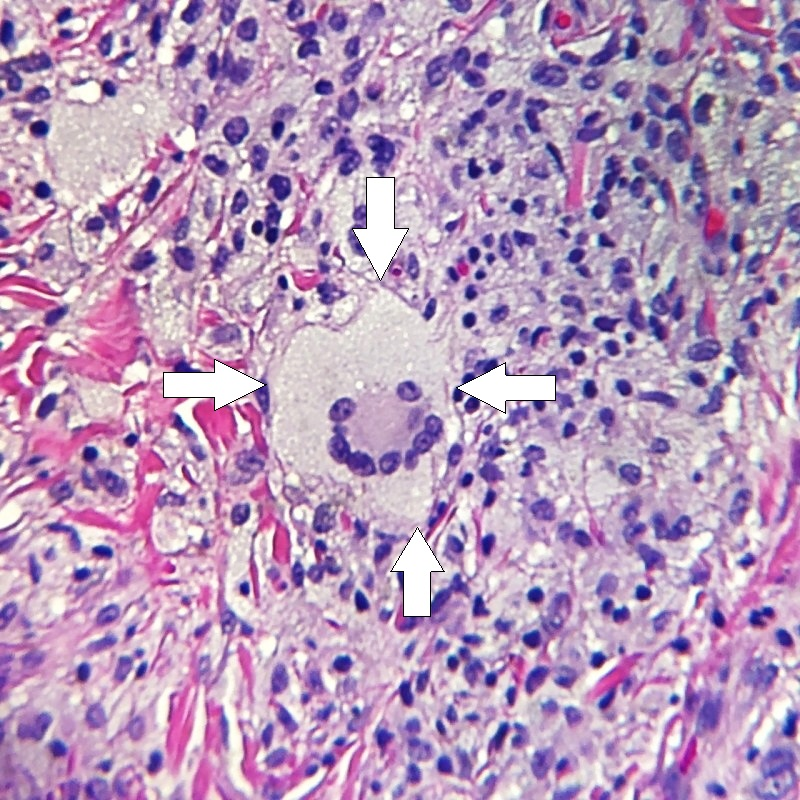
Touton giant cell

== Sources ==
This article incorporates text from a free content work. Licensed under Creative Commons Attribution 4.0 International (CC BY 4.0) license. (license statement/permission). Text taken from Dermatitis, Patholines.
