= Vaccinia immune globulin =

Vaccinia immune globulin (VIG) is made from the pooled blood of individuals who have been inoculated with the smallpox vaccine. The antibodies these individuals developed in response to the smallpox vaccine are removed and purified. This results in VIG. It can be administered intravenously. It is used to treat individuals who have developed progressive vaccinia after smallpox vaccination.

It was also used along with cidofovir for the 2003 Midwest monkeypox outbreak as concomitant therapy to reduce the serious side effects of smallpox vaccine. In addition, CDC states that use of VIGIV may be considered for postexposure prophylaxis of monkeypox in exposed individuals who cannot receive postexposure vaccination with smallpox vaccine because of severe T-cell function immunodeficiency.

== Adverse effects of smallpox vaccine ==
For a small percentage of the population, the smallpox vaccine either does not "take" or it produces adverse events. These include postvaccinial central nervous system disease, progressive vaccinia, eczema vaccinatum, accidental implantations, "generalized vaccinia", and the common erythematous or urticarial rashes.

== Development of immune globulin ==
In the late 1940s, Henry Kempe suggested that the solution to the complications of the smallpox vaccine was to provide antibodies in the form of gamma globulin, a medical treatment known as passive immunity. Kempe noted that for some infants, the smallpox vaccine failed to "take". Kempe believed this failure might be due to the high levels of maternal antibodies to vaccinia in the infants' blood. It appeared to Kempe that the presence of the antibodies blocked viral replication, and therefore a transfusion of antibodies from people who were immune due to vaccination would help those in whom vaccination had failed.

Two intravenous formulations of VIG (VIGIV Cangene and VIGIV Dynport) have been licensed by the FDA for the management of patients with progressive vaccinia, eczema vaccinatum, severe generalized vaccinia, and extensive body surface involvement or periocular implantation following inadvertent inoculation.

Cangene (a subsidiary of Emergent BioSolutions) brand-name VIGIV is also known by an alternate name: C-VIG; CNJ 016; NP 016 – Cangene; VIG; VIGIV – Emergent BioSolutions. This type of medicine called an antiserum has been used in many treatments successfully, and some research and clinical trials for its use treating monkeypox has been completed.

An initial post-marketing study was updated in 2021 to verify the clinical benefits of VIGIV (CNJ-016, Vaccinia Immune Globulin Intravenous (Human), sterile solution) in the resolution of complications resulting from Orthopoxvirus vaccination in eligible patients treated with VIGIV named Clinical Outcomes of VIGIV Treatment of Smallpox Vaccination Complications or Vaccinia Infection.

== Orthopoxvirus Vaccination ==
Vaccinia immune globulin intravenous (VIGIV) is recommended as the first line of therapy for treatment of adverse reactions resulting from continued vaccinia virus replication after vaccination using ACAM2000 or APSV.

VIGIV is not commercially available but can be made available through the Strategic National Stockpile (SNS) for the treatment of smallpox vaccine complications in patients with serious clinical manifestations.

Other treatments are

- Cidofovir
- Brincidofovir (TEMBEXA)
- Tecovirimat (ST-246 or its brand name Tpoxx)

The Orthopoxvirus (Smallpox) vaccine management guidelines are available from the Centers for Disease Control and Prevention.

Literature such as Progressive Vaccinia: Case Description and Laboratory-Guided Therapy With Vaccinia Immune Globulin, ST-246®, and CMX001 explains in clinical terms to the layperson (non-medical staff, or the patient and their families) what happens during this treatment when they are sick.

HIV and AIDS positive people are at risk of developing reactions and side-effects when they have Orthopoxvirus. Literature such as Progressive Vaccinia Acquired through Zoonotic Transmission in a Patient with HIV/AIDS explains again in clinical terms why patients with immunodeficiency (from HIV infection, or from any other medical condition that affects the immune system) are at high risk. Likewise, infants (and by extension during pregnancy), and the elderly with pre-existing medical conditions are more likely to have more serious reactions. For people who have been taking serum antibodies for immunodeficiency, VIGIV has a different name and is for a specific case (if they get necrosis from a smallpox vaccine) rather than a generalized treatment for immunodeficiency. These (IgG, IgA, IgM, IgD, and IgE) previously have been researched for use with Modified Vaccinia virus Ankara, more so than VIGIV as a treatment for monkeypox.

== See also ==
- Cangene
- Eczema vaccinatum
- Gamma globulin
- Immunoglobulin therapy – an overview of this topic.
- Vaccinia virus
