= Regdanvimab =

Monoclonal antibody

Monoclonal antibody
- Type: Whole antibody
- Source: Human
- Target: Spike protein of SARS-CoV-2

Clinical data
- Trade names: Regkirona
- Other names: CT-P59
- License data: EU EMA: by INN
- Pregnancy category: AU: B2
- Routes of administration: Intravenous
- ATC code: J06BD06 (WHO)

Legal status
- Legal status: AU: S4 (Prescription only); EU: Rx-only; In general: ℞ (Prescription only)

Identifiers
- CAS Number: 2444308-95-4
- DrugBank: DB16405
- UNII: I0BGE6P6I6
- KEGG: D12241

Regdanvimab, sold under the brand name Regkirona, is a human monoclonal antibody used for the treatment of COVID-19. The antibody is directed against the spike protein of SARS-CoV-2. It is developed by Celltrion. The medicine is given by infusion (drip) into a vein.

The most common side effects include infusion-related reactions, including allergic reactions and anaphylaxis.

Regdanvimab was authorized for medical use in the European Union in November 2021.

== Medical uses ==
In the European Union, regdanvimab is indicated for the treatment of adults with COVID-19 who do not require supplemental oxygen and who are at increased risk of progressing to severe COVID-19.

== Society and culture ==
=== Legal status ===
In March 2021, the Committee for Medicinal Products for Human Use (CHMP) of the European Medicines Agency (EMA) started a rolling review of data on regdanvimab. In October 2021, the EMA started evaluating an application for marketing authorization for the monoclonal antibody regdanvimab (Regkirona) to treat adults with COVID-19 who do not require supplemental oxygen therapy and who are at increased risk of progressing to severe COVID-19. The applicant is Celltrion Healthcare Hungary Kft. The European Medicines Agency (EMA) concluded that regdanvimab can be used for the treatment of confirmed COVID-19 in adults who do not require supplemental oxygen therapy and who are at high risk of progressing to severe COVID-19.

In November 2021, the Committee for Medicinal Products for Human Use (CHMP) of the European Medicines Agency (EMA) recommended granting a marketing authorization in the European Union for regdanvimab (Regkirona) for the treatment of COVID-19. The company that applied for authorization of Regkirona is Celltrion Healthcare Hungary Kft. Regdanvimab was authorized for medical use in the European Union in November 2021.

=== Names ===
Regdanvimab is the international nonproprietary name (INN).
