= Autoeczematization =

Medical skin condition

Autoeczematization refers to the development of widespread dermatitis or dermatitis distant from a local inflammatory focus. Autosensitization (autoeczematization or "id" reaction) refers to an acute, pruritic papulovesicular eruption that develops at cutaneous sites distant from a primary focus and is unrelated to the inciting cause of the primary inflammation.

The pathogenesis is not fully understood. One hypothesis is that autoeczematization is due to hyperirritability of the skin induced by immunologic or nonimmunologic stimuli and mediated by epidermal cytokines. Histologic findings are nonspecific and include spongiosis and a dermal lymphohistiocytic infiltrate with eosinophils.

== See also ==
- Autosensitization dermatitis
- List of cutaneous conditions
