= Sipavibart =

Medication

Monoclonal antibody
- Type: Whole antibody
- Source: Human
- Target: SARS-CoV-2

Clinical data
- Trade names: Kavigale
- Other names: AZD-3152
- ATC code: J06BD09 (WHO)

Legal status
- Legal status: CA: ℞-only; EU: Rx-only

Identifiers
- CAS Number: 2768288-97-5
- UNII: 977D2P9YYW
- KEGG: D12974

Sipavibart, sold under the brand name Kavigale, is a medication used for the prevention of COVID-19 in people who are immunocompromised. Sipavibart is a recombinant human IgG1 monoclonal antibody that provides passive immunization against SARS-CoV-2 by binding its spike protein receptor binding domain.

Sipavibart was authorized for medical use in the European Union in January 2025.

== Medical uses ==
Sipavibart is indicated for the pre-exposure prophylaxis of COVID-19 in people aged twelve years of age and older weighing at least 40 kilograms (88 lb) and who are immunocompromised due to a medical condition or receipt of immunosuppressive treatments.

== Society and culture ==
=== Legal status ===
In December 2024, the Committee for Medicinal Products for Human Use of the European Medicines Agency adopted a positive opinion, recommending the granting of a marketing authorization for the medicinal product Kavigale, intended for the prevention of COVID-19 in immunocompromised people aged twelve years of age and older. Kavigale was reviewed under the EMA's accelerated assessment program. The applicant for this medicinal product is AstraZeneca AB. Sipavibart was authorized for medical use in the European Union in January 2025.

=== Names ===
Sipavibart is the international nonproprietary name.

Sipavibart is sold under the brand name Kavigale.
