= Dermatitis =

Inflammatory disease of the skin

- Other names: Eczema
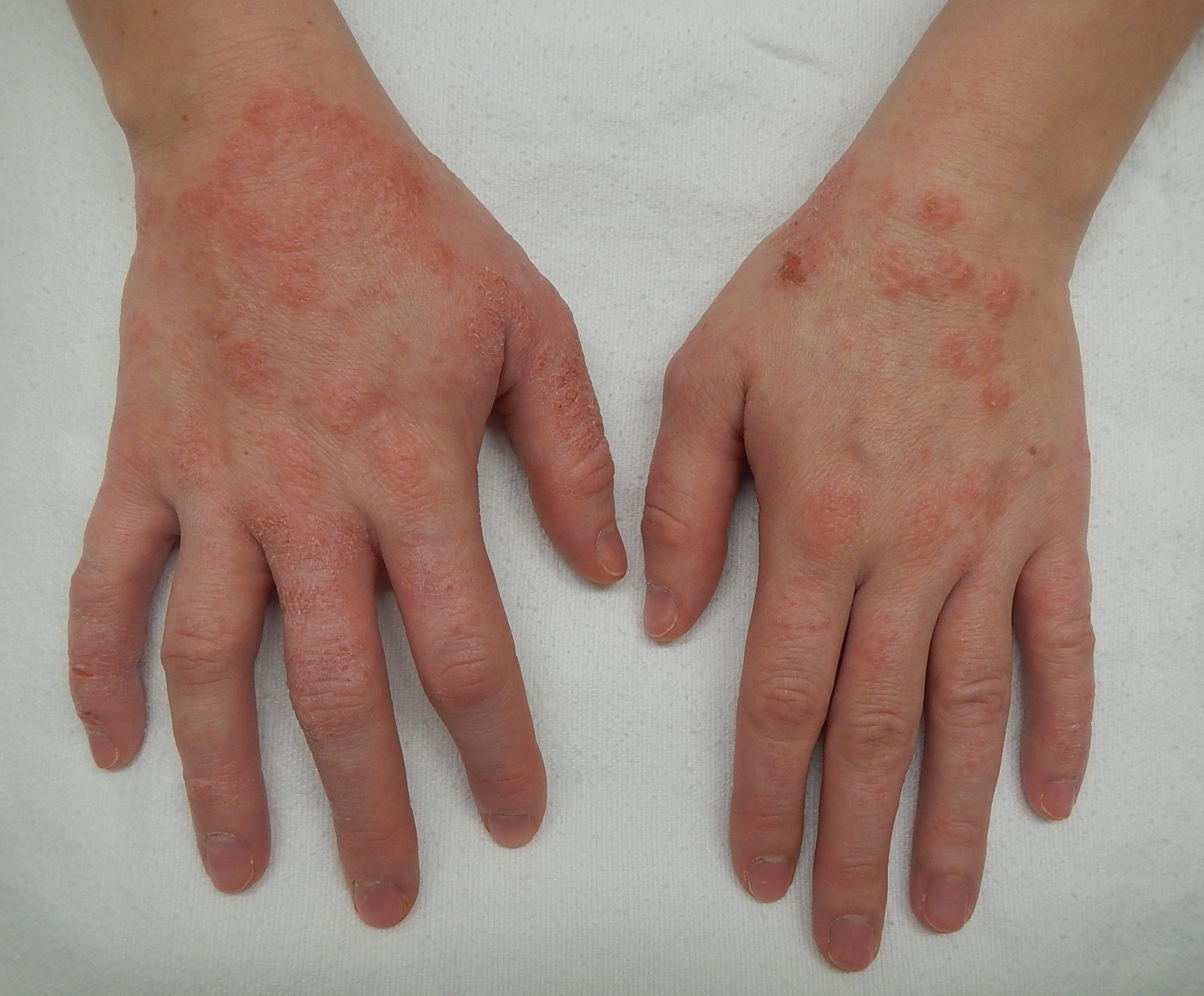
- A moderate case of dermatitis of the hands
- Specialty: Dermatology
- Symptoms: Itchiness, red skin, rash
- Complications: Skin infection
- Causes: Atopic dermatitis, allergic contact dermatitis, irritant contact dermatitis, seborrhoeic dermatitis, stasis dermatitis
- Diagnostic method: Based on symptom
- Differential diagnosis: Scabies, psoriasis, dermatitis herpetiformis, lichen simplex chronicus
- Prevention: Essential fatty acids
- Treatment: Moisturizers, steroid creams, antihistamines
- Frequency: 245 million in 2015 (3.34% of world population)

Dermatitis is a term used for different types of skin inflammation, typically characterized by itchiness, redness and a rash. In cases of short duration, there may be small blisters, while in long-term cases the skin may become thickened. The area of skin involved can vary from small to covering the entire body. Dermatitis is also called eczema, but "eczema" is often used for the most common type of skin inflammation, atopic dermatitis.

The exact cause of the condition is often unclear. Cases may involve a combination of allergy and poor venous return. The type of dermatitis is generally determined by the person's history and the location of the rash. For example, irritant dermatitis often occurs on the hands of those who frequently get them wet. Allergic contact dermatitis occurs upon exposure to an allergen, causing a hypersensitivity reaction in the skin.

Prevention of atopic dermatitis is typically with essential fatty acids, and may be treated with moisturizers and steroid creams. The steroid creams should generally be of mid to high strength and used for less than two weeks at a time, as side effects can occur. Antibiotics may be required if there are signs of skin infection. Contact dermatitis is typically treated by avoiding the allergen or irritant. Antihistamines may help with sleep and decrease nighttime scratching.

Dermatitis was estimated to affect 245 million people globally in 2015, or 3.34% of the world population. Atopic dermatitis is the most common type and generally starts in childhood. In the United States, it affects about 10–30% of people. Contact dermatitis is twice as common in females as in males. Allergic contact dermatitis affects about 7% of people at some point in their lives. Irritant contact dermatitis is common, especially among people with certain occupations, exact rates are unclear.

== Terminology ==
The terms dermatitis and eczema are sometimes used synonymously. However the term eczema is often used to specifically mean atopic dermatitis (also known as atopic eczema). Terminology might also differ according to countries. In some languages, dermatitis and eczema mean the same thing, while in other languages, dermatitis implies an acute condition and eczema a chronic one.

== Signs and symptoms ==
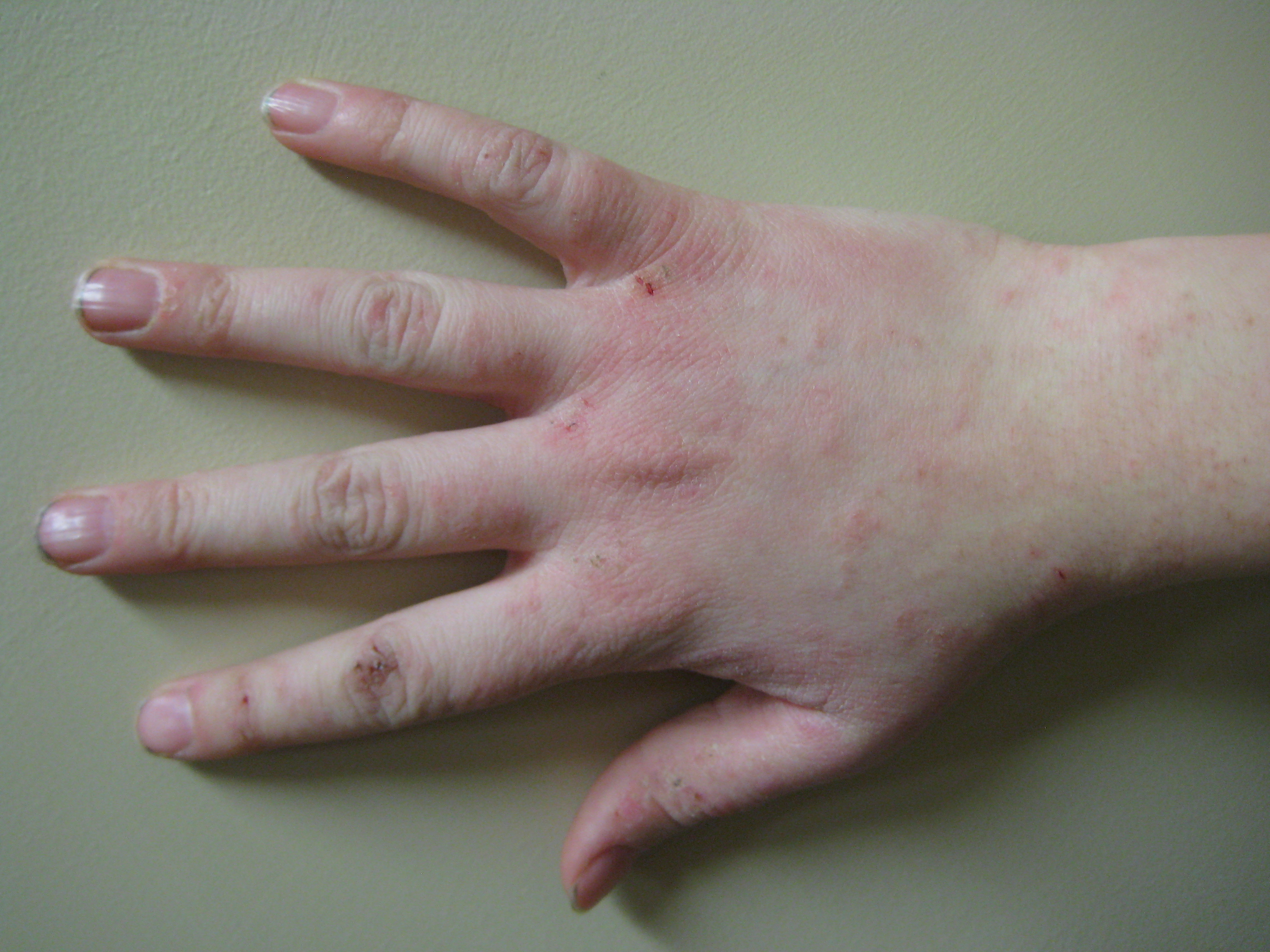
Dermatitis of the hand

There are several types of dermatitis, including atopic dermatitis, contact dermatitis, stasis dermatitis, and seborrhoeic dermatitis. Dermatitis symptoms vary with all different forms of the condition. Although every type of dermatitis has different symptoms, there are certain signs that are common for all of them, including redness of the skin, swelling, itching, and skin lesions with sometimes oozing and scarring. Also, the area of the skin on which the symptoms appear tends to be different with every type of dermatitis, whether on the neck, wrist, forearm, thigh or ankle.

Although the location may vary, the primary symptom of this condition is itchy skin. More rarely, it may appear on the genital area, such as the vulva or scrotum. Symptoms of this type of dermatitis may be very intense and may come and go. Irritant contact dermatitis is usually more painful than itchy.

Although the symptoms of atopic dermatitis vary from person to person, the most common symptoms are dry, itchy, red skin on light skin. However, this redness does not appear on darker skin, and dermatitis can appear darker brown or purple in color. Typical affected skin areas include the folds of the arms, the back of the knees, wrists, face and hands. Perioral dermatitis refers to a red, bumpy rash around the mouth.

Dermatitis herpetiformis symptoms include itching, stinging, and a burning sensation. Papules and vesicles are commonly present. The small red bumps experienced in this type of dermatitis are usually about 1 cm in size, red in color and may be found symmetrically grouped or distributed on the upper or lower back, buttocks, elbows, knees, neck, shoulders and scalp.

The symptoms of seborrhoeic dermatitis, on the other hand, tend to appear gradually, from dry or greasy scaling of the scalp (dandruff) to scaling of facial areas, sometimes with itching, but without hair loss. In newborns, the condition causes a thick and yellowish scalp rash, often accompanied by a diaper rash. In severe cases, symptoms may appear along the hairline, behind the ears, on the eyebrows, on the bridge of the nose, around the nose, on the chest, and on the upper back.

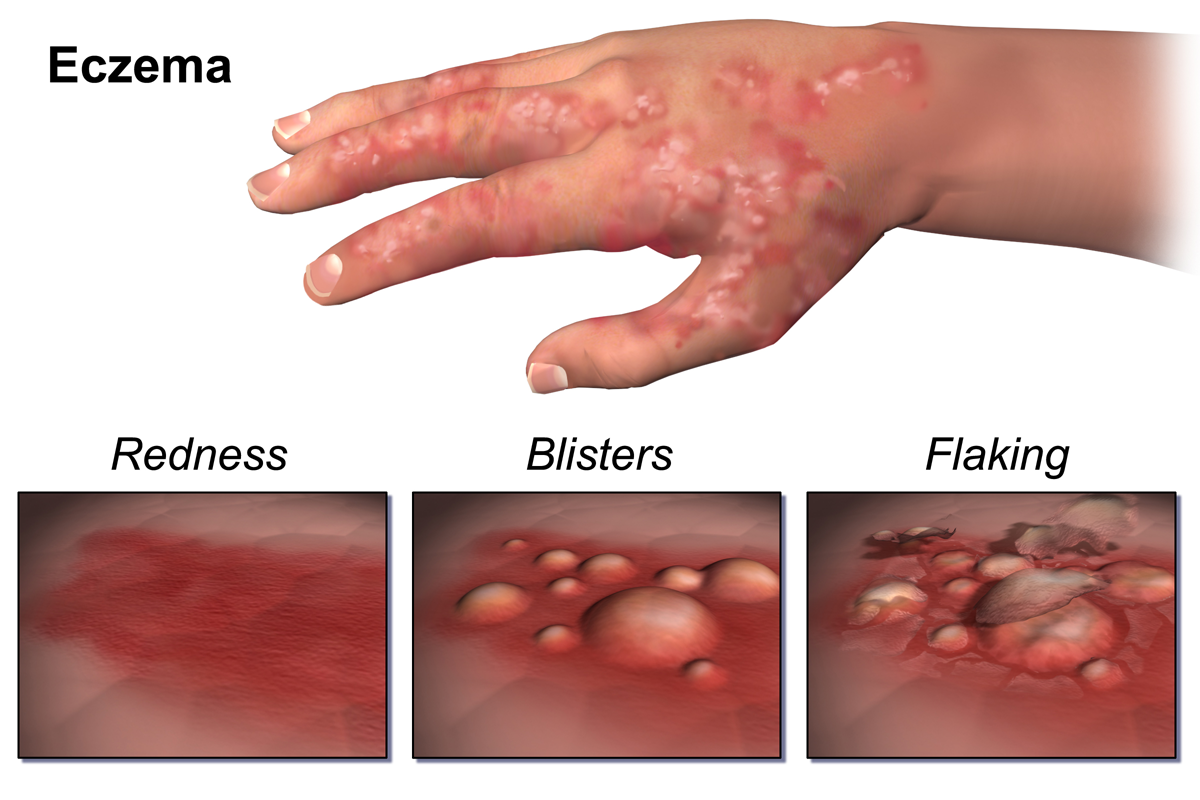
Dermatitis

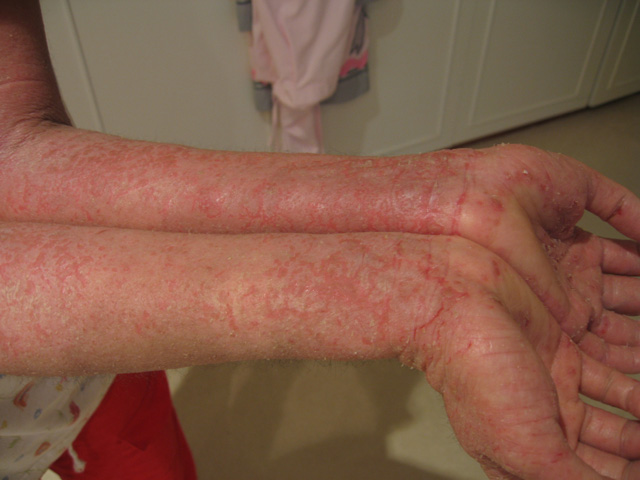
More severe dermatitis

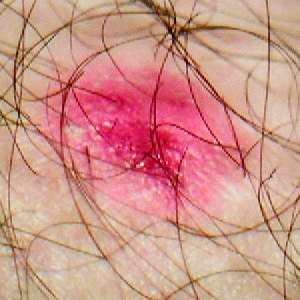
A patch of dermatitis that has been scratched

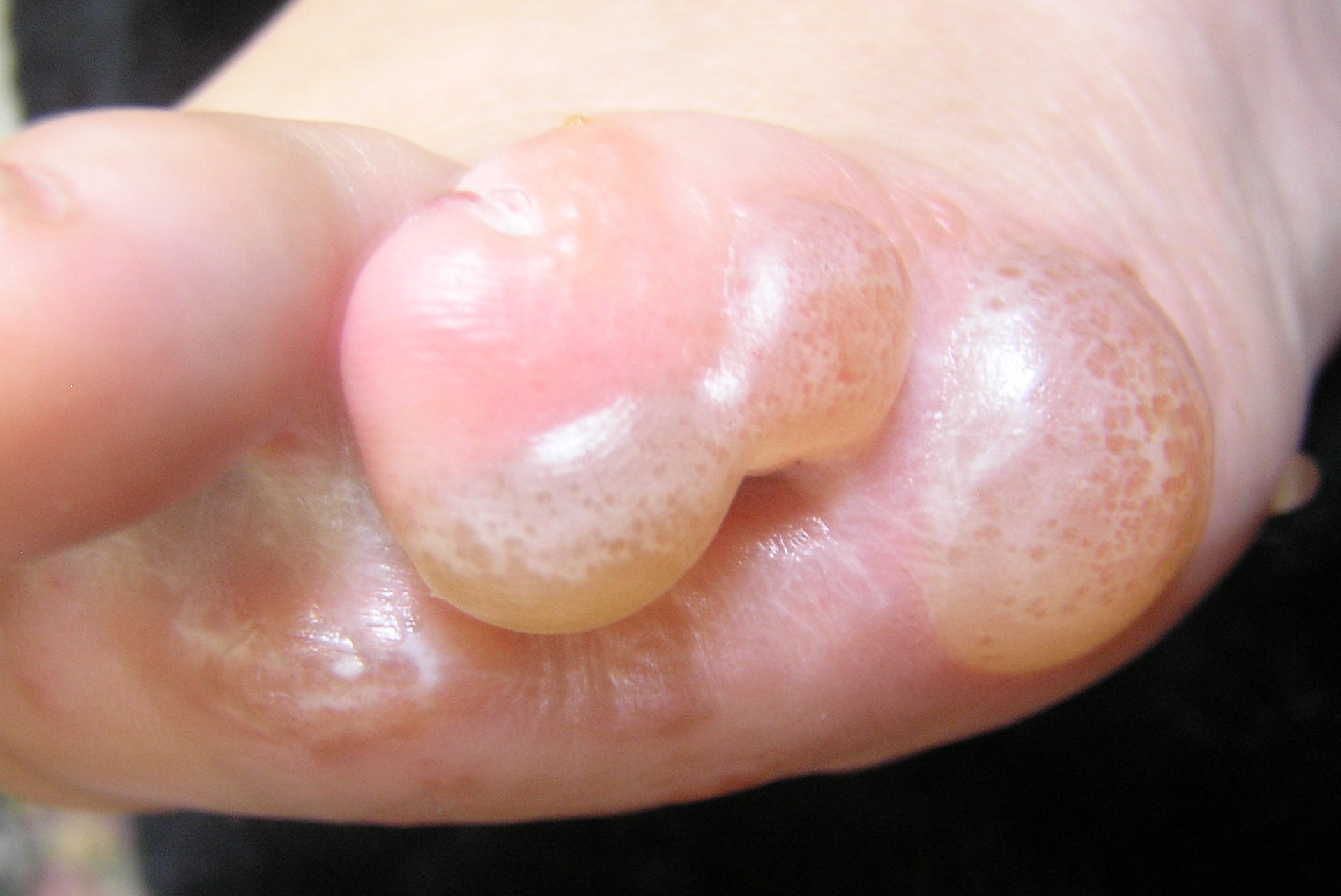
Complex dermatitis

=== Complications ===
People with eczema should not receive the smallpox vaccination due to risk of developing eczema vaccinatum, a potentially severe and sometimes fatal complication. Other major health risks for people with dermatitis are viral and bacterial infections because atopic dermatitis patients have deficiencies in their proteins and lipids that have barrier functions along with defects in dendritic cells and as a result are unable to keep foreign invaders out, leading to recurring infections. If left untreated, these infections may be life-threatening, so skin barrier improvement (such as daily moisturizing to minimize transepidermal water loss) and anti-inflammatory therapy are recommended as preventative measures.

== Cause ==
The cause of dermatitis is unknown, but it is presumed to be a combination of genetic and environmental factors. Eczema is not contagious.

=== Environmental ===
The hygiene hypothesis postulates that the cause of asthma, eczema, and other allergic diseases is an unusually clean environment in childhood, which leads to an insufficient human microbiota. It is supported by epidemiologic studies for asthma. The hypothesis states that exposure to bacteria and other immune system modulators is important during development, and missing out on this exposure increases the risk for asthma and allergy. One systematic review of literature on eczema found that urban areas have an increased prevalence of eczema compared to rural areas. While it has been suggested that eczema may sometimes be an allergic reaction to the excrement from house dust mites, with up to 5% of people showing antibodies to the mites, the overall role this plays awaits further corroboration.

==== Malnutrition ====
Essential fatty acid deficiency results in a dermatitis similar to that seen in zinc or biotin deficiency.

=== Genetic ===
A number of genes have been associated with eczema, one of which affects the production of filaggrin. Genome-wide studies found three new genetic variants associated with eczema: OVOL1, ACTL9 and IL4-KIF3A.

Eczema occurs about three times more frequently in individuals with celiac disease and about two times more frequently in relatives of those with celiac disease, potentially indicating a genetic link between the conditions.

== Diagnosis ==
Diagnosis of eczema is based mostly on the history and physical examination. In uncertain cases, skin biopsy may be taken for a histopathologic diagnosis of dermatitis. Those with eczema may be especially prone to misdiagnosis of food allergies.

Patch tests are used in the diagnosis of allergic contact dermatitis.

=== Classification ===
The term eczema refers to a set of clinical characteristics. Classification of the underlying diseases has been haphazard with numerous different classification systems, and many synonyms being used to describe the same condition.

A type of dermatitis may be described by location (e.g., hand eczema), by specific appearance (eczema craquele or discoid) or by possible cause (varicose eczema). Further adding to the confusion, many sources use the term eczema interchangeably for the most common type: atopic dermatitis.

The European Academy of Allergology and Clinical Immunology (EAACI) published a position paper in 2001, which simplifies the nomenclature of allergy-related diseases, including atopic and allergic contact eczemas. Non-allergic eczemas are not affected by this proposal.

==== Histopathologic classification ====
By histopathology, superficial dermatitis (in the epidermis, papillary dermis, and superficial vascular plexus) can basically be classified into either of the following groups:

- Vesiculobullous lesions
- Pustular dermatosis
- Non vesiculobullous, non-pustular

- With epidermal changes
- Without epidermal changes. These characteristically have a superficial perivascular inflammatory infiltrate and can be classified by type of cell infiltrate:

- Lymphocytic (most common)
- Lymphoeosinophilic
- Lymphoplasmacytic
- Mast cell
- Lymphohistiocytic
- Neutrophilic

=== Common types ===
==== Atopic ====
Atopic dermatitis is an allergic disease believed to have a hereditary component and often runs in families whose members have asthma. Itchy rash is particularly noticeable on the head and scalp, neck, inside of elbows, behind knees, and buttocks. It is very common in developed countries and is rising. Irritant contact dermatitis is sometimes misdiagnosed as atopic dermatitis. Stress can cause atopic dermatitis to worsen.

==== Contact ====
Contact dermatitis is of two types: allergic (resulting from a delayed reaction to an allergen, such as poison ivy, nickel, or Balsam of Peru), and irritant (resulting from direct reaction to a detergent, such as sodium lauryl sulfate, for example).

Some substances act both as allergens and irritants (wet cement, for example). Other substances cause a problem after sunlight exposure, bringing on phototoxic dermatitis. About three-quarters of cases of contact eczema are of the irritant type, which is the most common occupational skin disease. Contact eczema is curable, provided the offending substance can be avoided and its traces removed from one's environment. (ICD-10 L23; L24; L56.1; L56.0)

==== Seborrhoeic ====
Seborrhoeic dermatitis or seborrheic dermatitis is a condition sometimes classified as a form of eczema that is closely related to dandruff. It causes dry or greasy peeling of the scalp, eyebrows, and face, and sometimes trunk. In newborns, it causes a thick, yellow, crusty scalp rash called cradle cap, which seems related to lack of biotin and is often curable. (ICD-10 L21; L21.0)

There is a connection between seborrheic dermatitis and Malassezia fungus, and antifungals such as anti-dandruff shampoo can be helpful in treating it.

=== Less common types ===
==== Dyshidrosis ====
Dyshidrosis (dyshidrotic eczema, pompholyx, vesicular palmoplantar dermatitis) only occurs on palms, soles, and sides of fingers and toes. Tiny opaque bumps called vesicles, thickening, and cracks are accompanied by itching, which gets worse at night. A common type of hand eczema, it worsens in warm weather. (ICD-10 L30.1)

==== Discoid ====
Discoid eczema (nummular eczema, exudative eczema, microbial eczema) is characterized by round spots of oozing or dry rash, with clear boundaries, often on the lower legs. It is usually worse in winter. The cause is unknown, and the condition tends to come and go. (ICD-10 L30.0)

==== Venous ====
Venous eczema (gravitational eczema, stasis dermatitis, varicose eczema) occurs in people with impaired circulation, varicose veins, and edema, and is particularly common in the ankle area of people over 50. There is redness, scaling, darkening of the skin, and itching. The disorder predisposes to leg ulcers. (ICD-10 I83.1)

==== Herpetiformis ====
Dermatitis herpetiformis (Duhring's disease) causes an intensely itchy and typically symmetrical rash on arms, thighs, knees, and back. It is directly related to celiac disease, can often be put into remission with an appropriate diet, and tends to get worse at night. (ICD-10 L13.0)

==== Hyperkeratotic ====
Hyperkeratotic hand dermatitis presents with hyperkeratotic, fissure-prone, erythematous areas of the middle or proximal palm, and the volar surfaces of the fingers may also be involved.

==== Neurodermatitis ====
Neurodermatitis (lichen simplex chronicus, localized scratch dermatitis) is an itchy area of thickened, pigmented eczema patch that results from habitual rubbing and scratching. Usually, there is only one spot. Often curable through behaviour modification and anti-inflammatory medication. Prurigo nodularis is a related disorder showing multiple lumps. (ICD-10 L28.0; L28.1)

==== Autoeczematization ====
Autoeczematization (id reaction, auto sensitization) is an eczematous reaction to an infection with parasites, fungi, bacteria, or viruses. It is completely curable with the clearance of the original infection that caused it. The appearance varies depending on the cause. It always occurs some distance away from the original infection. (ICD-10 L30.2)

==== Viral ====
There are eczemas overlaid by viral infections (eczema herpeticum or vaccinatum), and eczemas resulting from underlying disease (e.g., lymphoma).

Eczemas originating from ingestion of medications, foods, and chemicals have not yet been clearly systematized. Other rare eczematous disorders exist in addition to those listed here.

== Prevention ==
There have been various studies on the prevention of dermatitis through diet, none of which have proven any positive effect.

Exclusive breastfeeding of infants during at least the first few months may decrease the risk. There is no good evidence that a mother's diet during pregnancy or breastfeeding affects the risk, nor is there evidence that delayed introduction of certain foods is useful. There is tentative evidence that probiotics in infancy may reduce rates but it is insufficient to recommend its use. There is moderate certainty evidence that the use of skin care interventions such as emollients within the first year of life of an infant's life is not effective in preventing eczema. In fact, it may increase the risk of skin infection and of unwanted effects such as allergic reaction to certain moisturizers and a stinging sensation.

=== Healthy diet ===
There has not been an adequate evaluation of changing the diet to reduce eczema. There is some evidence that infants with an established egg allergy may have a reduction in symptoms if eggs are eliminated from their diets. Benefits have not been shown for other elimination diets, though the studies are small and poorly executed. Establishing that there is a food allergy before dietary change could avoid unnecessary lifestyle changes.

==== Fatty acids ====
Oils with fatty acids that have been studied to prevent dermatitis include:

- Corn oil: Linoleic acid (LA)
- Fish oil: Eicosapentaenoic acid (EPA) and docosahexaenoic acid (DHA)
- Hemp seed oil: Linoleic acid (LA), and alpha-Linolenic acid (ALA)

In the 1950s Arild Hansen showed that infants fed skimmed milk developed essential fatty acid deficiency, which was characterized by increased food intake, poor growth, and scaly dermatitis, and was cured by the administration of corn oil.

== Management ==
There is no known cure for some types of dermatitis, with treatment aiming to control symptoms by reducing inflammation and relieving itching. Contact dermatitis is treated by avoiding what is causing it.

Seborrheic dermatitis is treated with antifungals such as anti-dandruff shampoo.

=== Lifestyle ===
Bathing once or more a day is recommended, usually for five to ten minutes in warm water. Soaps should be avoided, as they tend to strip the skin of natural oils and lead to excessive dryness. The American Academy of Dermatology suggests using a controlled amount of bleach diluted in a bath to help with atopic dermatitis.

People can wear clothing designed to manage the itching, scratching, and peeling.

House dust mite reduction and avoidance measures have been studied in low-quality trials and have not shown evidence of improving eczema.

=== Moisturizers ===
Low-quality evidence indicates that moisturizing agents (emollients) may reduce eczema severity and lead to fewer flares. In children, oil–based formulations appear to be better, and water–based formulations are not recommended. It is unclear if moisturizers that contain ceramides are more or less effective than others. Products that contain dyes, perfumes, or peanuts should not be used. Occlusive dressings at night may be useful.

Some moisturizers or barrier creams may reduce irritation in occupational irritant hand dermatitis, a skin disease that can affect people in jobs that regularly come into contact with water, detergents, chemicals or other irritants. Some emollients may reduce the number of flares in people with dermatitis.

=== Medications ===
==== Corticosteroids ====
If symptoms are well controlled with moisturizers, steroids may only be required when flares occur. Corticosteroids are effective in controlling and suppressing symptoms in most cases. Once daily use is generally enough. For mild-moderate eczema, a weak steroid may be used (e.g., hydrocortisone), while in more severe cases a higher-potency steroid (e.g., clobetasol propionate) may be used. In severe cases, oral or injectable corticosteroids may be used. While these usually bring about rapid improvements, they have greater side effects.

Long-term use of topical steroids may result in skin atrophy, stria, and telangiectasia. Their use on delicate skin (face or groin) is therefore typically with caution. They are, however, generally well tolerated. Red burning skin, where the skin turns red upon stopping steroid use, has been reported among adults who use topical steroids at least daily for more than a year.

==== Antihistamines ====
There is little evidence supporting the use of antihistamine medications for the relief of dermatitis. Sedative antihistamines, such as diphenhydramine, may be useful in those who are unable to sleep due to eczema. Second-generation antihistamines have minimal evidence of benefit. Of the second-generation antihistamines studied, fexofenadine is the only one to show evidence of improvement in itching with minimal side effects.

==== Immunosuppressants ====
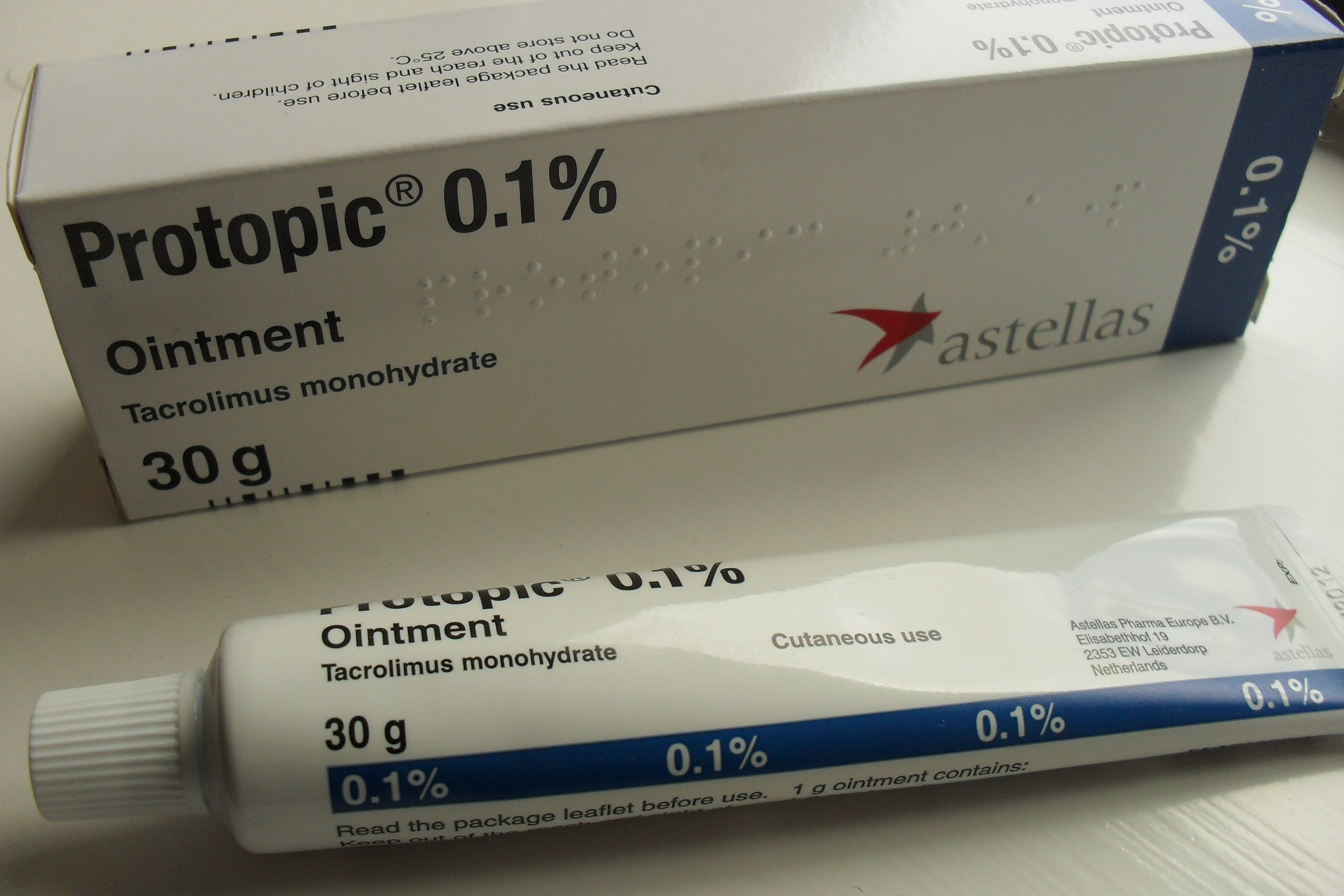
Tacrolimus 0.1%

Topical immunosuppressants like pimecrolimus and tacrolimus may be better in the short term and appear equal to steroids after a year of use. Their use is reasonable in those who do not respond to or are not tolerant of steroids. Treatments are typically recommended for short or fixed periods of time rather than indefinitely. Tacrolimus 0.1% has generally proved more effective than pimecrolimus, and equal in effect to mid-potency topical steroids. There is no association to increased risk of cancer from topical use of pimecrolimus nor tacrolimus.

When eczema is severe and does not respond to other forms of treatment, systemic immunosuppressants are sometimes used. Immunosuppressants can cause significant side effects, and some require regular blood tests. The most commonly used are cyclosporin, azathioprine, and methotrexate.

Dupilumab is a new (Note: Dupilumab received approval from the US Food and Drug Administration for moderate-to-severe atopic dermatitis in 2017 and for asthma in 2018.) medication that improves eczema lesions, especially moderate to severe eczema. Dupilumab, a monoclonal antibody, suppresses inflammation by targeting the interleukin-4 receptor.

==== Antifungals ====
Antifungals are used in the treatment of seborrheic dermatitis.

==== Others ====
In September 2021, ruxolitinib cream (Opzelura) was approved by the U.S. Food and Drug Administration (FDA) for the topical treatment of mild to moderate atopic dermatitis. It is a topical Janus kinase inhibitor.

=== Light therapy ===
==== Narrowband UVB ====
Atopic dermatitis (AD) may be treated with narrowband UVB, which increases 25-hydroxyvitamin D_{3} in persons in individuals with AD.

Light therapy using heliotherapy, balneophototherapy, psoralen plus UVA (PUVA therapy), light has tentative support but the quality of the evidence is not very good compared with narrowband UVB and UVA1. UVB is more effective than UVA1 for treatment of atopical dermatitis.

Overexposure to ultraviolet light carries its own risks, particularly that of skin cancer.

=== Alternative medicine ===
==== Topical ====
Chiropractic spinal manipulation lacks evidence to support its use for dermatitis. There is little evidence supporting the use of psychological treatments. While dilute bleach baths have been used for infected dermatitis, there is no good evidence for the safety or effectiveness of this practice.

==== Supplements ====
- Sulfur: There is currently no scientific evidence for the claim that sulfur treatment relieves eczema.
- Chinese herbology: it is unclear whether Chinese herbs help or harm. Dietary supplements are commonly used by people with eczema.
- Neither evening primrose oil nor borage seed oil taken orally have been shown to be effective. Both are associated with gastrointestinal upset.
- Probiotics are likely to make little to no difference in symptoms.

== Prognosis ==
Most cases are well managed with topical treatments and ultraviolet light. About 2% of cases are not. In more than 60% of young children, the condition subsides by adolescence.

== Epidemiology ==
Globally, dermatitis affected approximately 230 million people as of 2010 (3.5% of the population). Dermatitis is most commonly seen in infancy, with female predominance of eczema presentations occurring during the reproductive period of 15–49 years. In the UK about 20% of children have the condition, while in the United States about 10% are affected.

Although little data on the rates of eczema over time exists prior to the 1940s, the rate of eczema has been found to have increased substantially in the latter half of the 20th century, with eczema in school-aged children being found to increase between the late 1940s and 2000. In the developed world there has been rise in the rate of eczema over time. The incidence and lifetime prevalence of eczema in England have been seen to increase in recent times.

Dermatitis affected about 10% of U.S. workers in 2010, representing over 15 million workers with dermatitis. Prevalence rates were higher among females than among males and among those with some college education or a college degree compared to those with a high school diploma or less. Workers employed in healthcare and social assistance industries and life, physical, and social science occupations had the highest rates of reported dermatitis. About 6% of dermatitis cases among U.S. workers were attributed to work by a healthcare professional, indicating that the prevalence rate of work-related dermatitis among workers was at least 0.6%.

== Etymology and history ==
from Ancient Greek ἔκζεμα ékzema,
from ἐκζέ-ειν ekzé-ein,
from ἐκ ek 'out' + ζέ-ειν zé-ein 'to boil'

— (OED)

The term atopic dermatitis was coined in 1933 by Wise and Sulzberger. Sulfur as a topical treatment for eczema was fashionable in the Victorian and Edwardian eras.

The word dermatitis is from the Greek δέρμα derma 'skin' and -ῖτις -itis 'inflammation' and eczema is from Greek: ἔκζεμα ekzema 'eruption'.

== Society and culture ==
Some cosmetics are marketed as hypoallergenic to imply that their use is less likely to lead to an allergic reaction than other products. However, the term hypoallergenic is not regulated, and no research has been done showing that products labeled hypoallergenic are less problematic than any others. In 1977, courts overruled the U.S. Food and Drug Administration's regulation of the use of the term hypoallergenic. In 2019, the European Union released a document about claims made concerning cosmetics, but this was issued as guidance, not a regulation.

== Research ==
Monoclonal antibodies are under preliminary research to determine their potential as treatments for atopic dermatitis, with only dupilumab showing evidence of efficacy, as of 2018.
