= Nebacumab =

Monoclonal antibody

Monoclonal antibody
- Type: Whole antibody
- Source: Human
- Target: endotoxin

Clinical data
- AHFS/Drugs.com: International Drug Names
- ATC code: J06BC01 (WHO)

Identifiers
- CAS Number: 138661-01-5
- ChemSpider: none
- UNII: 908FWN27WK
- KEGG: D05126

Nebacumab is a human monoclonal antibody developed for the treatment of sepsis. It has been withdrawn in 1993 because it failed to reduce mortality in clinical trials.
