= Camurus =

Swedish pharmaceutical company

Camurus AB
- Company type: Public (Aktiebolag)
- Traded as: Nasdaq Stockholm: CAMX
- Industry: Pharmaceutical
- Revenue: ▲1,717 million kr (2023)
- Number of employees: 213
- Website: www.camurus.com

Camurus AB (publ) is a Swedish research-based pharmaceutical and biotechnology company specialising in the commercialization of medicines for treating serious and chronic diseases. Established in 1991 and based in the southern university city of Lund, in the Medicon Valley region, the company is listed on Nasdaq Stockholm, Mid Cap.

Camurus was founded by scientists in biophysical, food, and pharmaceutical chemistry with expertise in lipid phase structures. The company provides nanoscale drug-delivery systems for development of high-value therapeutics.

== Company profile ==
Camurus aims to collaborate with biotechnology and pharmaceutical companies worldwide to enable and improve the delivery of a wide range of drug compounds. These compounds including peptides, proteins, and insoluble small molecules make use of delivery solutions ranging from long-acting depots to lipid nanocarriers designed for improved intravenous, transdermal, and oral delivery.

Camurus' in-house product portfolio targets healthcare needs in areas of growth-hormone disorders, cancer, oncology supportive care, metabolic disease, and drug addiction.

=== Awards ===
In 2007, British investors evaluated six nominated private companies and chose to Camurus as the best privately owned biotechnology company in the Medicon Valley. The company was awarded the Strictly Financing Award 2007. In 2013, Camurus was awarded CPhI Pharma Award for Best Innovation in Formulation.

== Technologies ==
Camurus is a company focused on the development of lipid lyotropic liquid crystal structures for pharmaceutical drug delivery applications. These structures are well-defined three-dimensional formations consisting of lipophilic and hydrophilic domains that can be either interconnected or isolated depending on the environmentally induced phase conditions. The unique crystalline structures offer a unique way of encapsulating and transporting Active pharmaceutical ingredients, such as small molecules, peptides and proteins through the body. The structures also allow for the use of controlled release and prevention of degradation of fragile short half live molecules, a serious issue for amino-acid based drugs.

=== FluidCrystal technology ===
Camurus' FluidCrystal are available as injectable depots and topical bioadhesive delivery technologies. By encapsulating the drug compound in the nanostructures, injectable depots are able to deliver therapeutic levels of drug substance over extended periods from a single injection. This leads to a decrease in traditional side effects associated with high initial drug release on injection (drug burst), poor drug stability, and complex processing requirements, making the system highly suitable for sustained parental delivery of peptides, proteins, and small molecule drug compounds. The topical delivery system creates a bio-adhesive film that provides local and continual release of drug compounds. The delivery system is suited for delivery of peptide, protein, and small molecule drug compounds and can be applied to dermal, buccal, ophthalmic, nasal, vaginal, and other topical surfaces.

== Products ==
=== Elyzol dental gel - parodontitis ===
Camurus has partnered with Colgate-Palmolive for the marketing of their Elyzol dental gel for the treatment of parodontitis. Elyzol 25% dental gel contains metronidazole in the form of metronidazole benzoate as the active substance.

=== Episil - oral mucositis pain ===
Oral mucositis is a severe side-effect of chemotherapy or radiotherapy during cancer treatment, and is often a dose-limiting factor in treatment. episil is administered as a lipid-based liquid that spreads on the intra-oral mucosal surfaces and transforms to a strongly bioadhesive FluidCrystal film that mechanically protects the sensitized and sore epithelium of the oral cavity. It has been demonstrated in several clinical trials that episil gives an immediate and significant reduction of pain. This analgesic effect was maintained over at least 8 hours following administration. The treatment was reported to be safe and well tolerated. The product is registered as a medical device in a wide range of countries, including the European Union and the United States.

=== CAM2029 - growth hormone disorders ===
CAM2029 is a product for the treatment of acromegaly and carcinoid tumours. CAM2029 was assessed in a double blind, randomized, parallel-group, placebo controlled Phase I trial. CAM2029 is partnered with Novartis.

=== CAM2032 - prostate cancer ===
CAM2032 is a new drug being developed for long-term treatment of prostate cancer, with development also initiated for endometriosis. Camurus has completed a Phase IIa clinical trial of CAM2032 in patients with advanced metastatic prostate cancer.

=== CAM2038 - drug addiction ===
CAM2038 represents a new treatment concept for opiate addiction based on the well-documented anti-addiction therapeutic buprenorphine. CAM2038 is developed as a sustained release injection depot.
