= Eczema herpeticum =

Rare but severe and contagious disseminated infection

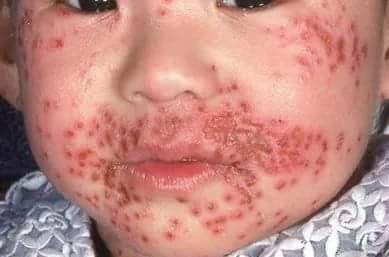
- Specialty: Infectious diseases

Eczema herpeticum is a rare but severe and contagious disseminated infection that generally occurs at sites of skin damage produced by, for example, atopic dermatitis, burns, long-term usage of topical steroids or eczema. It is also known as Kaposi varicelliform eruption, Pustulosis varioliformis acute and Kaposi–Juliusberg dermatitis.

Some sources reserve the term "eczema herpeticum" when the cause is due to human herpes simplex virus, and the term "Kaposi varicelliform eruption" to describe the general presentation without specifying the virus.

This condition is most commonly caused by herpes simplex virus type 1 or 2, but may also be caused by coxsackievirus A16, or vaccinia virus. It appears as numerous umbilicated vesicles superimposed on healing atopic dermatitis. It is often accompanied by fever and lymphadenopathy. Eczema herpeticum can be life-threatening in babies.

== Presentation ==
In addition to the skin, this infection affects multiple organs, including the eyes, brain, lung, and liver, and can be fatal.

== Treatment ==
It can be treated with systemic antiviral drugs, such as aciclovir or valganciclovir. Foscarnet may also be used for immunocompromised host with Herpes simplex and acyclovir-resistant Herpes simplex.

== Epidemiology ==
Even though the disease may develop at any age, it is mostly present in childhood. Those who are affected typically have pre-existing cutaneous condition like atopic dermatitis.

== History ==
Eczema herpeticum was first described by Hungarian dermatologist Moriz Kaposi in 1887. Fritz Juliusberg coined the term Pustulosis varioliformis acute in 1898. Eczema herpeticum is caused by Herpes simplex virus HSV-1, the virus that causes cold sores; it can also be caused by other related viruses.

== See also ==
- Herpes simplex
- List of cutaneous conditions
