= Anthrax immune globulin =

Medication

Clinical data
- Trade names: Anthrasil
- License data: US DailyMed: Anthrasil
- Routes of administration: Intravenous
- ATC code: J06BB19 (WHO)

Legal status
- Legal status: CA: ℞-only; US: ℞-only

Identifiers
- ChemSpider: none
- UNII: VKZ83S945Z

Anthrax immune globulin, sold under the brand name Anthrasil, is a human immune globulin that is used in combination with antibiotics to treat anthrax. It was developed by Cangene and purchased in 2011 by the Biomedical Advanced Research and Development Authority (BARDA) under Project Bioshield. In March 2015, it was granted approval by the United States Food and Drug Administration for use in treating inhalation anthrax in conjunction with antibiotics.

== Preparation ==
Anthrax immune globulin is prepared from the plasma of donors who have been vaccinated against anthrax.

== Safety and efficacy testing ==
Due to the ethical and feasibility concerns with testing the efficacy of anthrax immune globulin in humans, it was tested in rabbits and monkeys under the FDA's animal efficacy rule. Following efficacy testing, anthrax immune globulin was tested for safety in human volunteers, where the most common side effects were headache, back pain, nausea and infusion site pain and swelling.
