= Anti-tetanus immunoglobulin =

Medication made up of antibodies against the tetanus toxin

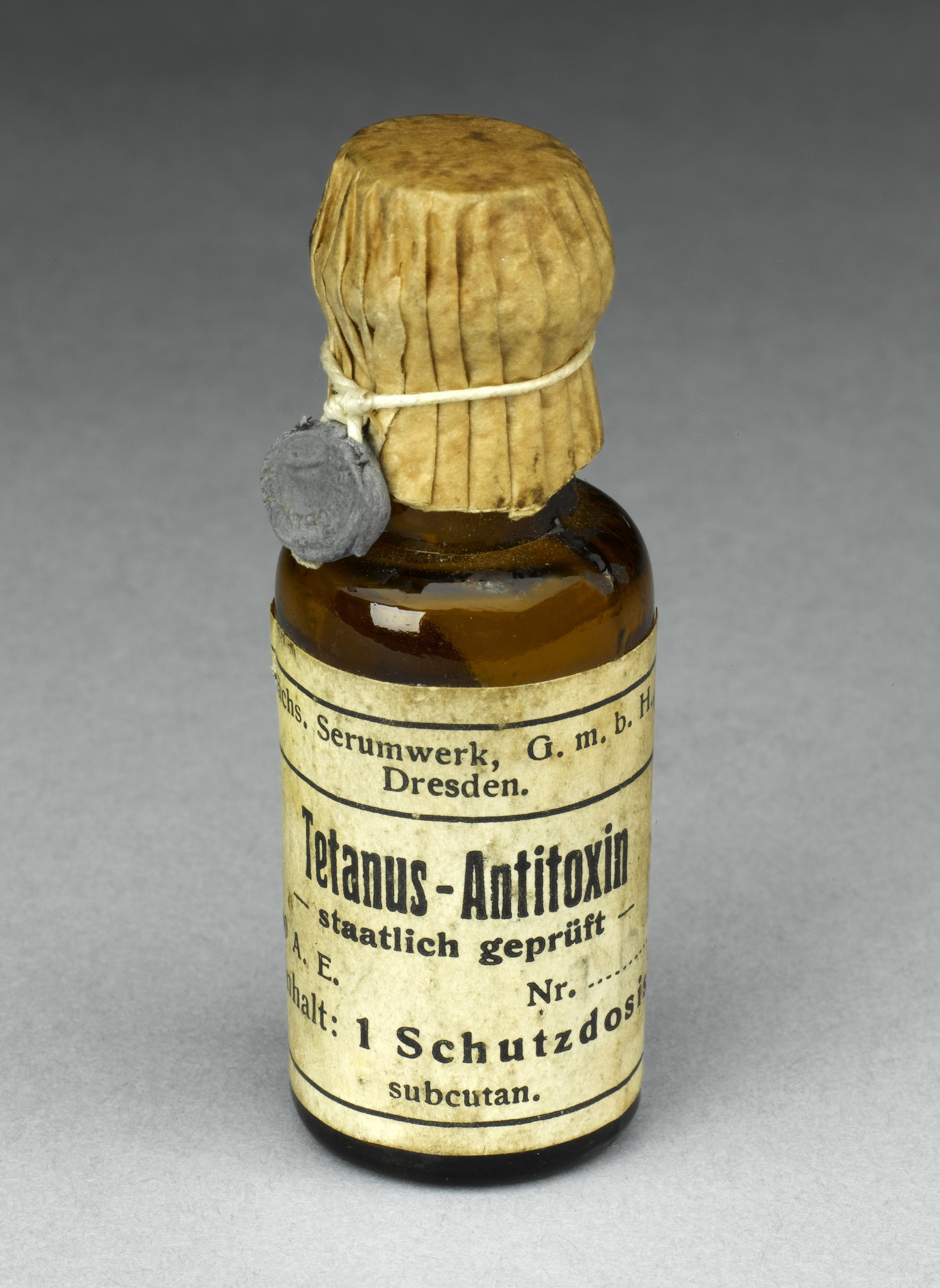
- A vintage single-dose bottle of tetanus antitoxin manufactured

Clinical data
- Trade names: HyperTET S/D, others
- Other names: tetanus immune globulin, tetanus antitoxin
- AHFS/Drugs.com: Monograph
- Routes of administration: Intramuscular
- ATC code: J06AA02 (WHO) J06BB02 (WHO)

Identifiers
- CAS Number: 1698057-17-8
- ChemSpider: none

Anti-tetanus immunoglobulin, also known as tetanus immune globulin (TIG) and tetanus antitoxin, is a medication made up of antibodies against the tetanus toxin. It is used to prevent tetanus in those who have a wound that is at high risk, have not been fully vaccinated with tetanus toxoid, or have HIV/AIDS. It is used to treat tetanus along with antibiotics and muscle relaxants. It is given by injection into a muscle. Part of the dose is injected at the site of the wound.

Common side effects include pain at the site of injection and fever. Allergic reactions including anaphylaxis may rarely occur. There is also a very low risk of the spread of infections such as viral hepatitis and HIV/AIDS with the human version. Use during pregnancy and lactation is acceptable. It is made from either human or horse blood plasma.

The immunoglobulin is categorized as immunoglobulin G (IgG). Since the tetanus toxin permanently binds to human tissues, only unbounded molecules can be neutralized by the immunoglobulin.

Use of the horse version became common in the 1910s, while the human version came into frequent use in the 1960s. It is on the World Health Organization's List of Essential Medicines. The human version may be unavailable in the developing world. The horse version is not typically used in the developed world due to the risk of serum sickness.
