= VZV immune globulin =

Medication

In medicine, varicella zoster virus globulin (VZV globulin), VZV antibodies, zoster immunoglobulin (ZIG), varicella zoster immune globulin (Vzig or Varizig), is an immune system medication that is used mostly for immunosuppressed patients who have been or may be exposed to the varicella zoster virus (VZV).

== Details ==
It shortens the course of cutaneous disease and may protect against its dissemination. Varicella zoster virus is a human herpes virus that causes chickenpox, shingles, Ramsay Hunt syndrome type 2, and postherpetic neuralgia. Unlike a Zoster vaccine which provides durable immunity, the protection is passive and short term; it may need to be readministered every 2-4 weeks as necessary. This medication is not recommended for administration to immune-competent persons for the treatment of active disease.

The immunoglobulin is prepared from the plasma of healthy donors with high titers of antibodies to VZV. A study was published in The Journal of Infectious Diseases that showed outdated blood from blood banks may have antibody concentrations that were equivalent to those in plasma of donors recovering from recent VZV infection that resulted in elevated levels of zoster immune globulin.

Another study published in The Journal of Infectious Diseases proved that varicella zoster immune globulin (VZIG) can be administered to children with suppressed immune systems to protect them against severe chicken pox.

A study also published in The Journal of Infectious Diseases found that immunocompetent subjects exposed to VZV resulting in an increased level of VZV antibodies suggests that subclinical reinfection occurs.
