= HMPV seasonal outbreak in China (2024) =

Surge of HMPV cases in 2024–2025 (China)

HMPV seasonal outbreak in China (2024–2025)
- Disease: HMPV
- Pathogen: Metapneumovirus
- Location: China

The HMPV seasonal outbreak in China, was caused by respiratory syndrome human metapneumovirus (HMPV), began with an increase in cases in Beijing, China in December 2024.

It was brought to public attention when the Chinese Center for Disease Control and Prevention published data showing that respiratory infections of human metapneumovirus had risen significantly in the week of 16 to 22 December 2024. However, WHO noted that the surge in cases of HMPV are within the range expected for this time of year during the northern hemisphere winter.

== Epidemiology ==
Model structure and proteins encoded by human metapneumovirus (hMPV)

HMPV has a worldwide distribution. In late 2024, human metapneumovirus was linked to 6.2 percent of positive respiratory illness tests and 5.4 percent of respiratory-illness hospitalizations in China, more than COVID-19, rhinovirus or adenovirus. Cases were reported in Hong Kong, with a lower growth rate than that of mainland China.

Kan Biao, head of the Chinese Center for Disease Control and Prevention (CCDC)'s National Institute for Communicable Disease Control and Prevention, announced that the rate of HMPV among children ages 14 and under was on the rise in China in late 2024. Chinese health officials stated that the surge was consistent with overall seasonal trends.

Cases were reported in Malaysia, with an increase of 102 cases from 225 cases in 2023 to 327 cases in 2024. The Malaysian Ministry of Health has urged the population to remain vigilant, using masks if infected and adopting other ways to avoid contagion.

== Disease ==
The symptoms of HMPV are often similar to that of the common cold, including cough, fever, runny or stuffy nose, sore throat, wheezing, shortness of breath and rash. HMPV activity typically peaks during late winter and spring, similar to other respiratory infections. Most people with HMPV have mild upper respiratory symptoms similar to the common cold and recover from HMPV in about 7 to 10 days without any complications. However, certain groups face a higher risk of severe complications:

- Pneumonia: HMPV can cause viral pneumonia, requiring hospitalization and intensive care in severe cases.
- Bronchiolitis: Infants and young children often experience inflammation and blockage of airways, leading to difficulty breathing and wheezing.
- Exacerbation of chronic conditions: HMPV can worsen existing respiratory conditions like asthma or chronic obstructive pulmonary disease (COPD).
- Secondary bacterial infections: these infections, such as bacterial pneumonia, may develop as complications due to a weakened immune system.
- Pregnancy complications: Respiratory issues caused by HMPV during pregnancy can lead to maternal and foetal health risks.

HMPV does not have a specific antiviral medication. Treatment primarily aims at managing symptoms and preventing complications. Rest and hydration, over-the-counter medications to control body-aches and fevers are recommended for mild conditions, while some cases may require oxygen therapy and hospitalization. Severe cases of hMPV as with individuals who are immunocompromised are treated with Ribavirin and IVIG.

No conclusive studies have proven the true method of transmission, but it is likely through contact with contaminated secretions, via droplet, aerosol, or fomite vectors.

HMPV belongs to the subfamily Pneumovirinae (genus Metapneumovirus). It is an enveloped, nonfragmented, negative-sense single-stranded RNA virus.

=== Diagnosis ===
Real-time polymerase chain reaction (RT-qPCR) tests are widely used in clinical HMPV detection due to their sensitivity, ability to give quick results (1–3 h) and ability to quantify the viral load which can assess the severity of the infection. RT-qPCR methods provide higher sensitivity, and lower probability of contamination compared to the conventional RT-PCR methods, thus it is considered as the gold standard diagnostic approach. It works by quantifying the viral load of HMPV to then confirm the presence of it once it reaches a threshold.

Reverse transcription polymerase chain reaction (RT-PCR) assays have been widely applied for viral molecular detection, including HMPV. It works by checking for HMPV-specific cDNA, which is amplified during the PCR process. It has also been widely used for performing epidemiological investigation of HMPV. RT-PCR assays for pathogen detection display lower sensitivity compared with RT-qPCR methods, which needs complex instruments. Thus, RT-PCR methods have been less applied for HMPV-clinical detection in recent years.

Loop-Mediated Isothermal Amplification (LAMP) is one of the most widely used isothermal methods in pathogen diagnosis. It eliminates the thermal-cycling that exists in PCR, which requires complex equipment. The detection results of the LAMP method can be observed and judged via the naked eyes. But compared to PCR based tests, the cost of LAMP is higher.

Virus isolation from the clinical samples is regarded as a gold standard for pathogen diagnosis, which is the initial step to developing vaccines and investigating viral pathogenesis. However, it is high cost and time-consuming, and low isolation rate, and requires complex instruments and trained workers.

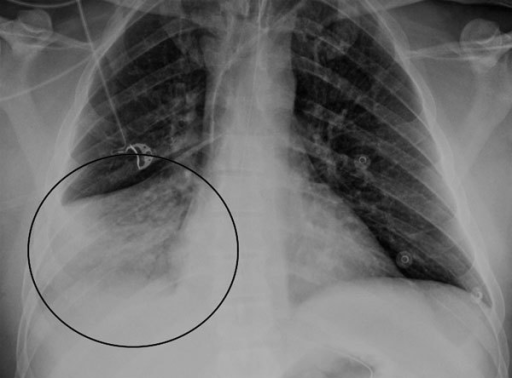
Frontal chest X-ray of a 47-year-old man with encephalitis-associated human metapneumovirus, Australia. Consolidation in the right middle lobe (circle) is compatible with pneumonia.

A Chest X-ray or bronchoscopy are also used to look for changes or pneumonia in the airways of your lungs.

=== Prevention ===
Moderna has conducted a clinical trial for a candidate modRNA vaccine against metapneumovirus. As of October 2019, the vaccine candidate has passed through phase I.

== Responses ==
=== India ===
The Union Health Secretary of India noted that there is no cause of concern for the public from HMPV. She advised states to strengthen and review the influenza-like illness (ILI)/severe acute respiratory infections (SARI) surveillance, to enhance Information, Education and Communication (IEC) and awareness among the population regarding prevention of transmission of the virus with simple measures such as washing hands often with soap and water. She reiterated that an increase in respiratory illnesses is usually seen during the winter months. She also stated that India is well prepared for any potential surge in respiratory illness cases.

=== Pakistan ===
In Pakistan, the National Institute of Health stated that HMPV had been reported in Pakistan since 2001, with 21 cases at Pakistan Institute of Medical Sciences (PIMS) in 2015. In early January 2025, the Pakistani government was closely monitoring the situation in China, and called a meeting of the National Command and Operation Center (NCOC).

== Confirmed cases ==
=== China ===
In late 2024, human metapneumovirus was linked to 6.2 percent of positive respiratory illness tests and 5.4 percent of respiratory-illness hospitalizations in China, more than COVID-19, rhinovirus or adenovirus.

=== Japan ===
The Ministry of Health's Department of Preventive Medicine reported on 5 February that Vietnam's event-based surveillance system has recorded information about the seasonal flu outbreak in Japan. According to data published by the National Institute of Infectious Diseases of Japan on 31 January, about 9.5 million cases of seasonal flu were recorded in Japan from 2 September 2024 to 26 January 2025. During the final week of 2024 alone (23–29 December), over 317,000 cases were reported.
