= Hoover's sign =

Hoover's sign refers to one of two signs named for Charles Franklin Hoover:

- Hoover's sign (leg paresis)
- Hoover's sign (pulmonary)
