= Litten's sign (lung) =

Litten's sign, also known as the diaphragm phenomenon, is a paralyzed hemidiaphragm, the portion of the diaphragm in contact with the parietal pleura during respiration in the base of the pleural cavity.

It's when the zone of apposition ( the portion of the diaphragm in contact with the parietal pleura during expiration in the base of the pleural cavity') is reduced by the flattening of the diaphragm during inspiration and the pressure in the last intercostal spaces changes from intra-abdominal to intra-thoracic pressure. This partially contributes to the expansion of the rib cages during ventilation.

This can be recognized by a slight change of sound when the percussion technique is used during expiration and inspiration in the last intercostal spaces. It is caused by a hyperinflation of the lungs associated with chronic obstructive pulmonary diseases, specially to emphysema. Related findings to emphysema Hoover's sign (lung).
