= Neonatal infection =

Human disease

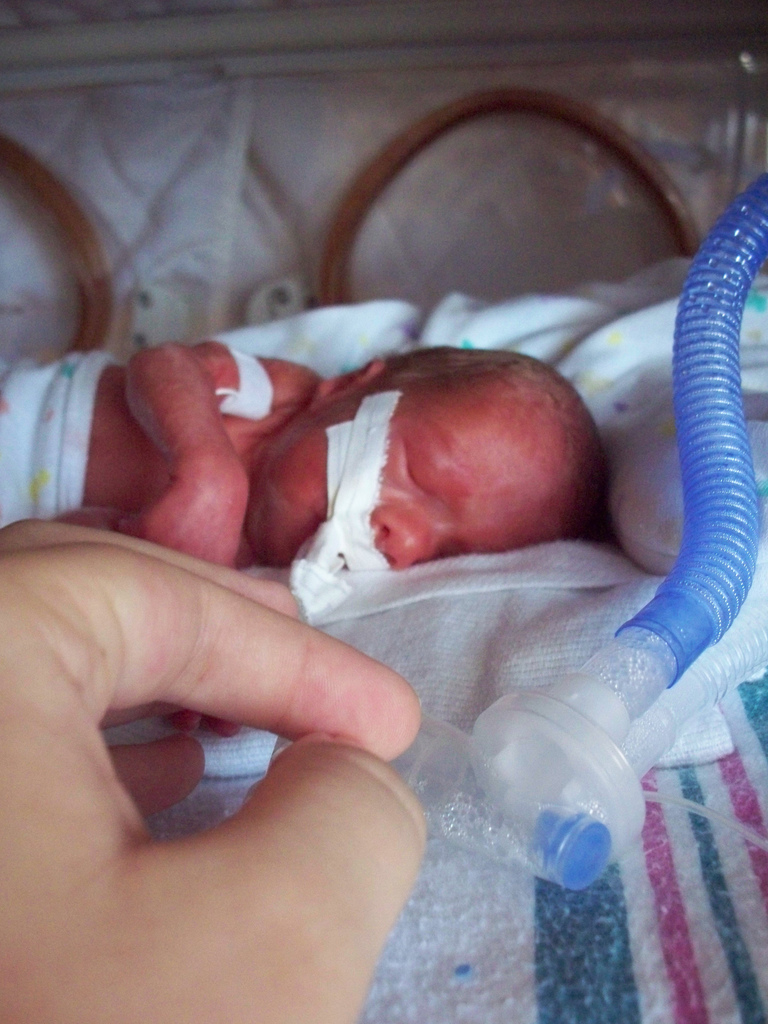
- 26-week gestation, premature infant, weighing <990gm with ventilator
- Specialty: Infectious disease, Pediatrics

Neonatal infections are infections of the neonate (newborn) acquired during prenatal development or within the first four weeks of life. Neonatal infections may be contracted by mother to child transmission, in the birth canal during childbirth, or after birth. Neonatal infections may present soon after delivery, or take several weeks to show symptoms. Some neonatal infections such as HIV, hepatitis B, and malaria do not become apparent until much later. Signs and symptoms of infection may include respiratory distress, temperature instability, irritability, poor feeding, failure to thrive, persistent crying and skin rashes.

Risk factors include previous maternal infection, preterm delivery (< 37 weeks gestation) and premature rupture of membranes (breakage of the amniotic sac) which substantially increases the risk of neonatal sepsis by allowing passage for bacteria to enter the womb prior to the birth of the infant. Preterm or low birth weight neonates are more vulnerable to neonatal infection. While preterm neonates are at a particularly high risk, all neonates can develop infection. Maternal screening for intrapartum infections reduce the risk of neonatal infection. Pregnant women may receive intrapartum antibiotic prophylaxis for prevention of neonatal infection.

Infant respiratory distress syndrome is a common complication of neonatal infection, a condition that causes difficulty breathing in preterm neonates. Respiratory distress syndrome can arise following neonatal infection, and this syndrome may have long-term negative consequences. In some instances, neonatal respiratory tract diseases may increase the susceptibility to future respiratory infections and inflammatory responses related to lung disease.

Antibiotics can be effective for neonatal infections, especially when the pathogen is quickly identified. Instead of relying solely on culturing techniques, pathogen identification has improved substantially with advancing technology; however, neonate mortality reduction has not kept pace. In industrialized countries, treatment for neonatal infections takes place in the neonatal intensive care unit (NICU). Neonatal infection can be distressing to the family and it initiates concentrated effort to treat it by clinicians. Research to improve treatment of infections and prophylactic treatment of the mother to avoid infections of the infant is ongoing.

== Signs and symptoms ==
Signs and symptoms of infection include respiratory distress, temperature instability, irritability, failure to thrive, and skin rashes.

== Etiologies ==
Early-onset sepsis (EOS), defined as onset of symptoms within 72 hours of life, is generally caused by transmission of pathogens from the female genitourinary system to the fetus. Pathogens can infect the fetus via vertical transmission (direct transmission through the placenta in utero) or infection during delivery as fetus passes through vaginal canal.

Late-onset sepsis (LOS), defined as onset of symptoms after 72 hours of life, is generally caused by transmission of pathogens from the environment after delivery. Infants requiring intravascular catheters and other invasive procedures are at increased risk for developing LOS.

There are many etiologies of neonatal infection, including bacterial, viral and fungal pathogens. The source of infectious bacteria and other pathogens is often the maternal gastrointestinal and genitourinary tract. Many of the maternal infections with these organisms are asymptomatic in the mother. Other maternal infections that may be transmitted to the infant in utero or during birth are bacterial and viral sexually transmitted infections. The infant's ability to resist infection is limited by its immature immune system. In addition, the immune system of the neonate may respond in ways that can create problems that complicate treatment, such as the release of inflammatory chemicals. Congenital defects of the immune system also affect the infants ability to fight off the infection.

=== Bacteria ===
Bacteria found in the maternal gastrointestinal or gastrourinary tracts can commonly lead to neonatal infection. Bacterial infections may present as fetal distress at birth (including signs of tachycardia, temperature instability or difficulty breathing), neonatal sepsis, or neonatal meningitis. Infections that develop during NICU admissions are more commonly coagulase-negative staphylococci, especially in infants with indwelling catheters. Infections that develop one month after the birth of the infant are more likely due to gram-positive bacteria and coagulase positive staphylococci. ...

==== Group B streptococcus (GBS) ====
Group B streptococcus (GBS), also named Streptococcus agalactiae, is a bacteria typically identified as the cause of the majority of early-onset infections in the neonate. GBS is an encapsulated gram-positive cocci that colonizes the gastrointestinal and genital tracts of pregnant women. Maternal infections are usually asymptomatic. This pathogen is vertically transmitted (transmitted directly from the mother's vagina into the infant's amniotic fluid after onset of labor). Due to the high prevalence of GBS, routine screening for the bacteria occurs during pregnancy. If the bacteria is found in the maternal GI / GU tract, mothers will receive IV antibiotic (usually penicillin or ampicillin).

==== Escherichia coli (E. coli) ====
Escherichia coli is an encapsulated gram-negative bacilli that may cause neonatal infections due to its high prevalence in the GI and GU tracts of pregnant patients. With the advances in preventing group B streptococcus infections, β-lactam-resistant Escherichia coli infections have increased in causing neonatal deaths in very low birthweight and premature infants. Common complications of neonatal E.coli infection include neonatal sepsis and neonatal meningitis.

==== Neisseria gonorrhoeae ====
Neisseria gonorrhoeae is a common sexually transmitted infection which may be present in pregnant women at time of delivery. This pathogen is usually acquired during delivery, occurring in 30-40% of cases with known maternal infection. Additionally, untreated maternal gonorrhea may increase the risk of preterm delivery. The most common manifestation of gonococcal infection in a newborn is neonatal conjunctivitis, an infection of the eyes that presents with green-yellow exudate and eyelid swelling. Without treatment, this infection can lead to permanent visual impairment. Treatment of Neisseria gonorrhoeae conjunctivitis consists of a single dose of ceftriaxone (antibiotic). Typically, all neonates (regardless of symptoms or risk factors) receive erythromycin ointment applied to both eyes after delivery

==== Listeria monocytogenes ====
Listeria monocytogenes is a gram-positive bacilli that can cause infection acquired from tainted food and present in the mother. The presence of this pathogen can sometimes be determined by the symptoms that appear as a gastrointestinal illness in the mother. The mother acquires infection from ingesting food that contains animal products such as hot dogs, unpasteurized milk, delicatessen meats, and cheese.

==== Clostridium tetani ====
Clostridium tetani can cause a generalised form of tetanus in the neonate. This usually occurs when the mother has not been vaccinated against tetanus and the baby has not acquired passive immunity. The umbilical cord region is the most susceptible.

==== Other bacterial pathogens ====
Less common bacterial pathogens include Streptococcus pyogenes, Viridans streptococci, Streptococcus pneumoniae, Haemophilus influenzae, and Pseudomonas aeruginosa.

=== Viruses ===
==== Human immunodeficiency virus (HIV) ====
Human immunodeficiency virus (HIV) infection can occur during delivery of the neonate, in utero through mother-to-child transmission or postnatally by way of breastfeeding. Most transmission occurs during delivery. Transmission depends on multiple risk factors, usually centered around the viral load of HIV in the mother. Strategies for reducing transmission of HIV include:

- Anti-retroviral therapy during pregnancy, reducing amount of HIV virus in the maternal bloodstream
- Delivery by caesarean section in mothers with plasma viral load > 1000 copies / mL
- Using prophylactic anti-retroviral therapy in the newborn infant, especially in mothers with high viral loads
- Avoiding breast-feeding

Symptoms of HIV in a child will vary depending on the age of presentation. Common symptoms include failure to thrive, recurrent infections such as pneumonia, intermittent diarrhea, swollen lymph nodes and oral thrush. In infants, diagnostic testing for HIV relies of detection of the virus in the bloodstream. For infants born to HIV-infected mothers, diagnostic testing will be performed within days of delivery, at 1–2 months and at 4–6 months of age.

==== Cytomegalovirus (CMV) ====
Cytomegalovirus (CMV) is the most common congenital viral infection, usually transmitted through the placenta during pregnancy. Most neonates with congenital CMV infection will not have any symptoms, but a minority of infected newborns will have symptomatic infection. Common symptoms include rash, microcephaly (small head), low birth weight, jaundice, thrombocytopenia, seizures and retinitis. Long-term complications of congenital CMV infections may include sensorineural hearing loss, developmental delay, and seizures. Due to high prevalence of disease, CMV is not routinely screened in pregnant patients.

==== Herpes simplex virus (HSV) ====
Herpes simplex virus (HSV), which commonly causes cold sores and painful genital blisters can cause congenital infection via direct contact with genital tract lesions during delivery. Neonatal HSV may be classified into three categories based on symptom presentation:

- Localized skin, eye and mouth disease: 35–45% of neonatal HSV infections. Presentation includes clustering vesicular lesions (blister-like) with erythematous (skin redness) base in localized area of skin which can spread to the eye or oropharynx. There is risk of progression to CNS or disseminated disease, so infants should be thoroughly evaluated for progression of symptoms.
- CNS disease: 30% of neonatal HSV infections. HSV spreads into the brain, leading to seizures, lethargy, irritability, poor feeding, temperature instability within the first six weeks of life. Diagnosis of CNS disease can be made with cerebrospinal fluid analysis or electroencephalogram (EEG) showing lateralized periodic discharges. It can be difficult to distinguish between HSV CNS disease and other causes of neonatal meningitis; therefore, it is recommended to start empiric acyclovir in all cases of neonatal meningitis.
- Disseminated disease: 25–30% of neonatal HSV infections. Disease is defined by multi-organ involvement, including liver, lungs CNS, heart, kidney, GI tract, and skin. Neonates with disseminated HSV infection present with nonspecific symptoms of neonatal sepsis. All infants with signs of neonatal sepsis should undergo testing for HSV and empiric antiviral therapy.

==== Rubella ====
Maternal infection with rubella virus during pregnancy can lead to congenital rubella syndrome. The risk of congenital infection is highest during the first trimester (< 12 weeks). Risk of congenital rubella is increased among immigrant women from countries without adequate vaccination programs. Common symptoms include cataracts, hearing impairment, developmental delay and congenital heart disease.

==== Zika ====
Zika virus is an arthropod-borne virus transmitted by mosquitos, and infection during pregnancy can lead to severe congenital abnormalities in a newborn. Congenital infection can lead to fetal growth restriction and CNS abnormalities, including microcephaly, ventriculomegaly and intracranial calcifications.

==== Hepatitis ====
There are five liver specific viruses (hepatitis A, B, C, D, E) that could potentially harm the mother and child. Acute hepatitis A virus or acute hepatitis E virus infection present the greatest risk to maternal and fetal health and increased risk of adverse pregnancy outcomes. Hepatitis B, C and D virus present a risk of mother to child transmission but are dependent on the severity of the underlying disease in the mother. However, hepatitis B virus is the major cause of neonatal infection.

- Hepatitis A is a non-enveloped, single-stranded RNA virus that is spread through the fecal-oral route with the main modes of transmission being close personal contact or ingestion of contaminated food or water. During pregnancy, hepatitis A can cause placental abruption, premature rupture of membranes, and increased rates of preterm labor.
- Hepatitis B is an enveloped, double stranded DNA virus that is spread by exposure to blood, with the main modes of transmission are blood, sexual transmission, or perinatal. During pregnancy, acute hepatitis B infection can result in increased risk of preterm delivery, low birth weight and increased risk of gestational diabetes mellitus. Chronic hepatitis B infection is the largest concern globally. Chronic hepatitis B infection can lead to acute liver failure and increased alanine aminotransferase flares. There is also an increased risk of mother to child transmission and occurs during the delivery of the neonate from an infected mother. Some infected neonates will develop acute hepatitis B and symptomatically will develop abdominal distension, jaundice, clay- colored stools and failure to thrive. However, most infected neonates will be asymptomatic but will chronically have persistent hepatitis B surface antigens in the blood and elevated transaminase levels.
- Hepatitis C is an enveloped, single stranded RNA virus that is spread by exposure to blood, with the main modes of transmission are blood, sexual transmission, or perinatal. Chronic infection with hepatitis C virus may influence pregnancy outcomes, such as increased rates of small for gestational age, intrauterine death, low birthweight, and preterm delivery, but no clear association between these adverse outcomes and hepatitis C infection have been observed. There is also an increased risk of mother to child transmission and is largely attributable to events during the birth process.
- Hepatitis D is a single stranded RNA virus that is spread by exposure to blood, with the main modes of transmission are blood, sexual transmission, or perinatal. There is limited research on the effects of hepatitis D infection on fetal or infant outcomes, but the effects are thought to be similar to those with hepatitis B infection.
- Hepatitis E is a non-enveloped, single stranded RNA virus that is spread through the fecal-oral route with the main modes of transmission being close personal contact or ingestion of contaminated food or water. During pregnancy, acute hepatitis E infections result in an increase in adverse pregnancy outcomes such as increased maternal and fetal morbidity and mortality, acute hepatic failure, and associated complications with preterm birth.

=== Other viral pathogens ===
Other viral infections, such as respiratory syncytial virus (RSV), metapneumovirus (hMPV), rhinovirus, parainfluenza (PIV), and human coronavirus in the neonatal period are associated with recurrent wheezing in later childhood.

=== Fungi ===
In very low birth weight infants (VLBWI), systemic fungus infection is a hospital-acquired infection with serious consequences. The pathogens are usually Candida albicans and Candida parapsilosis. A small percentage of fungal infections are caused by Aspergillus, Zygomycetes, Malassezia, and Trichosporon. Infection is usually late-onset. Up to 9% of VLBWI with birth weights of <1,000 g develop these fungus infections leading to sepsis or meningitis. As many as one-third of these infants can die. Candidiasis is associated with retinopathy, prematurity and negative neurodevelopmental consequences. Candida can colonize the gastrointestinal tract of low birthweight infants (LBI). This gastrointestinal colonization is often a precursor to a more serious invasive infection. The risk of serious candida infection increases when multiple factors are present. These are: thrombocytopenia, the presence of candidal dermatitis, the use of systemic steroids, birth weights of <1,000 g, presence of a central catheter, postponing enteral feeding, vaginal delivery, and the amount of time broad-spectrum antibiotics were given.

=== Protozoans ===
Infants born with malaria can be infected with a variety of species; Plasmodium vivax, Plasmodium malariae, Plasmodium ovale, and Plasmodium falciparum. In most instances of congenital malaria is caused by P. vivax and P. falciparum. Women living in areas where malaria is prevalent and common are repeatedly exposed to malaria. In response to maternal infection, mothers develop antimalarial antibodies. It is probable that the antibodies present in the mother offers protection for the baby. Bacterial infection can develop with malaria.

Infants that are infected by the protozoan Toxoplasma gondii in utero can be born with chorioretinitis or ocular toxoplasmosis. Globally, it is the most common cause of infections of the back of the eye. (posterior segment). The most common sign is decreased vision in one eye. Other signs and symptoms may appear after the neonatal period and include: chorioretinitis development later in life, intracranial calcification hydrocephalus or central nervous system abnormalities.

== Risk factors ==
Preterm neonates are at greater risk of infection, including severe complications such as sepsis and meningitis. Preterm neonates usually have ineffective immune systems, due to decreased IgG antibodies and decreased complement activation. Additionally, preterm neonates require longer hospital admissions, including the placement of invasive devices that increase risk of infection.

Maternal risk factors for neonatal infection include:

- Chorioamnionitis - acute inflammation of amniotic fluid and fetal membranes during pregnancy, usually caused by polymicrobial bacterial infection. Signs of infection include maternal fever, vaginal discharge, tender uterus or pain with urination.
- GBS Colonization - group B streptococcus is a bacterial pathogen commonly found in the gastrointestinal and vaginal membranes of healthy women. Presence of this bacteria is usually asymptomatic; therefore, pregnant patients will routinely be screened for presence of GBS prior to delivery.
- Delivery Before 37 Weeks - premature infants require more medical intervention and have less effective immune defenses, so these neonates are at increased risk of infection
- Prolonged Rupture of Membranes (PROM) - the amount of time between the rupture of amniotic membranes and delivery of the neonate is directly correlated with risk of neonatal infection. Prolonged course of labor increases neonatal exposure to bacterial and viral pathogens, increasing chance of infection.

== Mechanism ==
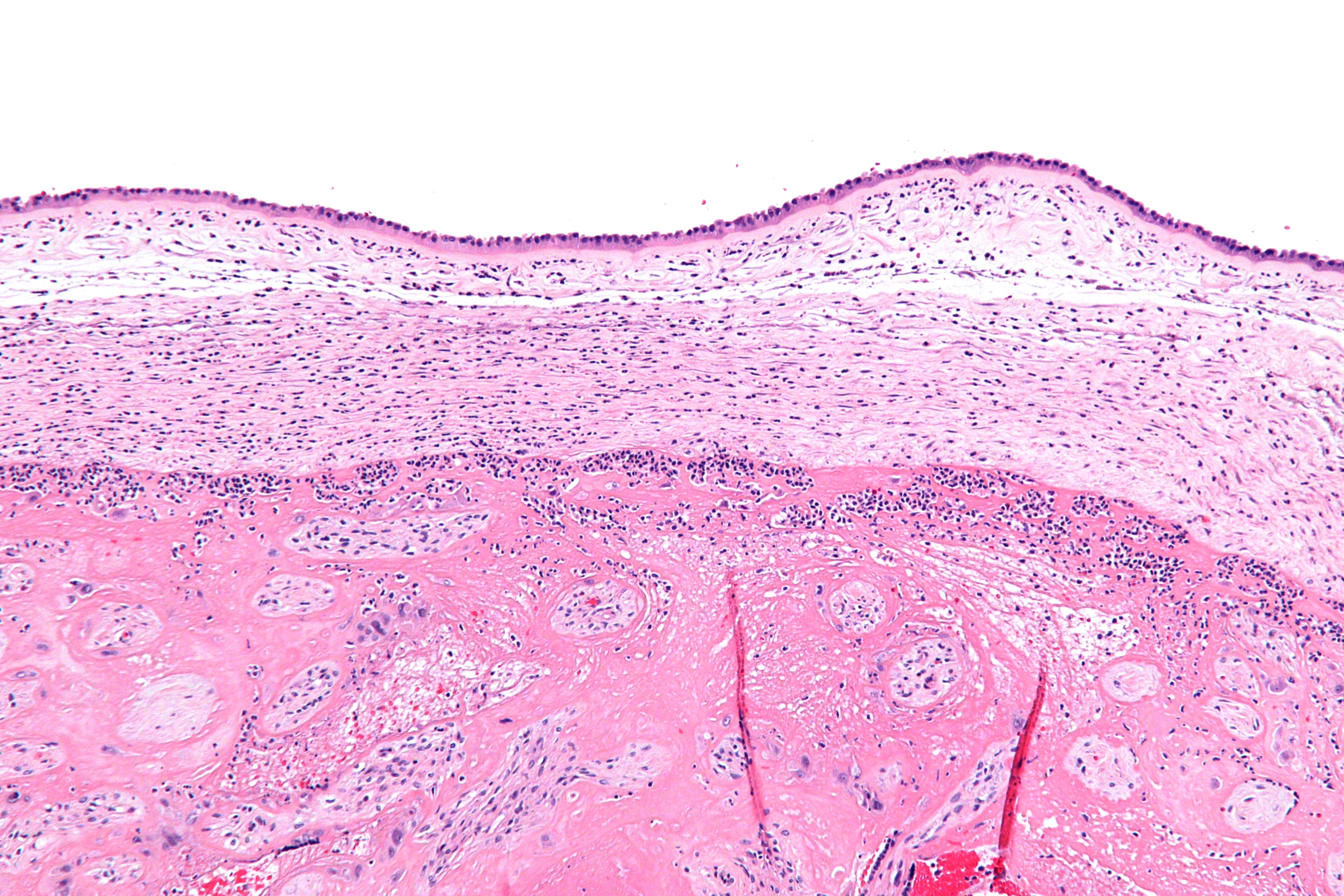
Chorioamnionitis

Inflammation accompanies infection and is likely to complicate treatment and recovery. Inflammation is linked to reduced growth of the lungs of the premature baby.

=== Pathogenesis ===
The recent identification of the presence of microorganisms in maternal-infant body fluids that were previously thought to be sterile has provided one explanation for the presence of the inflammatory response in both the mother and infant. Sixty-one percent of pregnant women with chorioamnionitis, or inflammation of the amniotic fluid, were found to be infected by microorganisms. Often, more than one pathogen was present. In fifteen percent of pregnant women inflammation was still evident even though there was no evidence of pathogens. This may indicate that there are other causes. A high percentage, 51% to 62%, of pregnant women who had chorioamnionitis also had inflammation of the placenta.

== Diagnosis ==
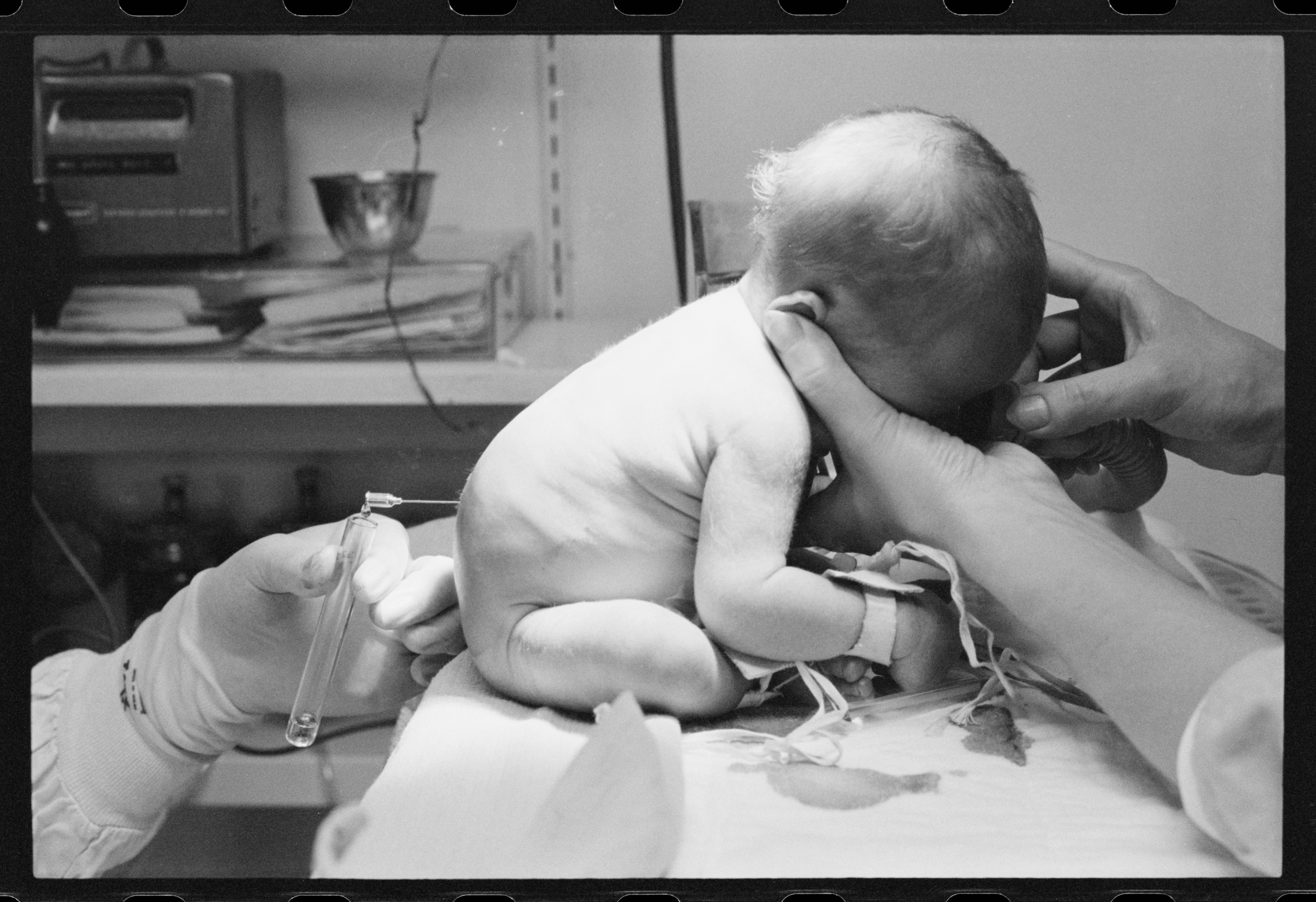
Lumbar puncture being performed on a newborn to detect presence of infection

Diagnosis of infection is based upon the recovery of the pathogen or pathogens from the typically sterile sites in the mother or the baby. Unfortunately, as many half of pregnant women are asymptomatic with a gonorrhea infection and other sexually transmitted infections. Samples are obtained from urine, blood or cerebrospinal fluid. Diagnosis of infection can also be aided by the use of more nonspecific tests such as determining the total white blood cell count, cytokine levels and other blood tests and signs.

Signs of infection	Notes	References
abnormal complete blood count	looking for signs of infection in the blood: increased white cell count; presence of immature neutrophils	
increased C-reactive protein	a chemical in the blood that shows that the baby's immune system is actively reacting to infection	
accessory muscle use	using the intercostal muscles to assist in breathing	
tachycardia	a heart rate that is faster than normal	
bradycardia	a heart rate that is slower than normal	
chest recession		
respiratory distress	the baby has trouble breathing	
nasal flaring	the baby's nostrils expand when it inhales	
expiratory grunt	a sound of effort when the baby exhales	
apnea	the baby stops breathing	
rash		
positive urine culture		
positive cerebral spinal fluid		
other positive cultures	from eyes, ear canal, umbilicus axilla anus	
lethargy	the baby seems tired and has slow or no movements	
hypotonia	the muscles seem flabby and weak	
hypothermia		
irritability	infant appears uncomfortable and has difficulty being soothed	
weak cry		
pneumonia		
poor perfusion	poor circulation	
hypotension	low blood pressure	
acidosis	pH imbalance in the blood	
diarrhea	water-like, unformed stools	
poor feeding		
oxygen requirement		
bulging fontanel	the soft spot on the head is bulging	
seizures		
fever		
disseminated intravascular coagulation	widespread clotting of blood	
kidney failure	kidneys do not function	
bacteremia	bacteria cultured from the blood of the newborn	

=== Viral infection ===
Symptoms and the isolation of the virus pathogen the upper respiratory tract is diagnostic. Virus identification is specific immunologic methods and PCR. The presence of the virus can be rapidly confirmed by the detection of the virus antigen. The methods and materials used for identifying the RSV virus has a specificity and sensitivity approaching 85% to 95%. Not all studies confirm this sensitivity. Antigen detection has comparatively lower sensitivity rates that approach 65% to 75%.

=== Protozoan infection ===
Congenital malaria has its own set of signs:

Signs of congenital malaria infection	Notes	References
splenomegaly	enlarged speen	
fever		
anemia		
jaundice		
poor feeding		
hepatomegaly	enlarged liver	
failure to thrive		
loose stools		
irritability		
hyperbilirubinemia		
central nervous system infection		
splenic rupture		
kidney failure		
blackwater fever	infection with P. falciparum only	

=== Neonatal sepsis ===
Neonatal sepsis of the newborn is an infection that has spread through the entire body. The inflammatory response to this systematic infection can be as serious as the infection itself. In infants that weigh under 1500 g, sepsis is the most common cause of death. Three to four percent of infants per 1000 births contract sepsis. The mortality rate from sepsis is near 25%. Infected sepsis in an infant can be identified by culturing the blood and spinal fluid and if suspected, intravenous antibiotics are usually started. Lumbar puncture is controversial because in some cases it has found not to be necessary while concurrently, without it estimates of missing up to one third of infants with meningitis is predicted.

== Prevention ==
To reduce neonatal infection, screening of pregnant women for HIV, hepatitis B, and syphilis, is available in the UK and the United States.

Treatment with a vaginal antibiotic wash prior to birth does not prevent infection with group B streptococcus bacteria (GBS). Treatment with vaginal chlorhexidine prior to birth does not prevent neonatal infections.

Because GBS bacteria can colonize the lower reproductive tract of 30% of women, typically pregnant women are tested for this pathogen from 35 to 37 weeks of pregnancy. Before delivery treatment of the mother with antibiotics reduces the rate of neonatal infection. Prevention of the infection of the baby is done by treating the mother with penicillin. Since the adoption of this prophylactic treatment, infant mortality from GBS infection has decreased by 80%.

Mothers with symptomatic genital herpes and who are treated with antiviral prophylaxis are less prone to have an active, symptomatic case at the time of birth and it may be able to reduce the risk of passing on HSV during birth. Cesarean delivery reduces the risk of infection of the infant.

Breastfeeding has been shown to protect the neonate from some infections. Breast milk protects against necrotizing enterocolitis.

Hepatitis A, B, and D are preventable via vaccination. Hepatitis A can be prevented by immunization against HAV, while Hepatitis B and D can both be prevented by immunization against HBV.

The Hepatitis B vaccination is among the first two injections a newborn receives. The other is vitamin K to prevent vitamin K deficiency bleeding. In cases where the pregnant woman is positive for hepatitis B, the baby will receive an additional dose of hepatitis B immunoglobulin in addition to the hepatitis B vaccine to prevent transmission of the disease from mother to baby. Prevention of hepatitis B is crucial as there is no currently no cure.

In general, in an unvaccinated individual, the viral hepatitis family causes liver damage due to a cell-mediated response via cytotoxic lymphocytes. Acute viral hepatitis can lead to jaundice, elevated bilirubin, elevated liver enzymes (aspartate transaminase, alanine transaminase, and alkaline phosphatase), and flu-like symptoms. Importantly, acute neonatal HBV infections progress to chronic Hepatitis B about 90% of the time. For both Hepatitis B and Hepatitis D, the most significant long-term complications are progression to cirrhosis and hepatocellular carcinoma, which carries high morbidity and mortality.

== Treatment ==
Neonatal infection treatment is typically started before the diagnosis of the cause can be confirmed. Neonatal infection can be prophylactically treated with antibiotics. Maternal treatment with antibiotics is primarily used to protect against group B streptococcus.

Women with a history of genital herpes, can be treated with antiviral drugs to prevent symptomatic lesions and viral shedding that could infect the infant at birth. The antiviral medications used include acyclovir, penciclovir, valacyclovir, and famciclovir. Only very small amounts of the drug can be detected in the fetus. There are no increases in drug-related abnormalities in the infant that could be attributed to acyclovir. Long-term effects of antiviral medications have not been evaluated for their effects after growth and development of the child occurs. Neutropenia can be a complication of acyclovir treatment of neonatal HSV infection, but is usually transient. Treatment with immunoglobulin therapy has not been proven to be effective and is not recommended.

== Epidemiology ==
Up to 3.3 million newborns die each year and 23.4% of these die of neonatal infection. About half of the deaths caused by sepsis or pneumonia happen in the first week postpartum. In industrialized countries, prophylactic antibiotic treatment of the mothers identified with group B streptococcus, early identification of sepsis in the newborn, and administration of antibiotics to the newborn has reduced mortality. Neonatal herpes in North America is estimated to be from 5 – 80 per 100,000 live births. HSV has a lower prevalence in mothers outside the United States. In the United Kingdom the incidence is much lower and estimated to be 1.6 per 100,000 live births. Approximately 70% to 80% of infected infants are born to mothers with no reported history of HSV infection.

Regions with low neonatal mortality include Europe, the Western Pacific, and the Americas, which have sepsis rates that account for 9.1% to 15.3% of the total neonatal deaths worldwide. This is in contrast with the 22.5 to 27.2% percentage of total deaths in resource-poor countries such as Nigeria, the Democratic Republic of the Congo, India, Pakistan, and China.

In the UK, the proportions of pregnant women who are newly screened positive for hepatitis B, syphilis, and HIV have remained constant since 2010 at about 0.4%, 0.14% and 0.15%, respectively. Estimated prevalence levels among pregnant women for hepatitis B and HIV, including previous diagnoses, were higher at 0.67% and 0.27%. Pregnant women evaluated as susceptible to rubella due to low antibody levels have increased by over 60%, to about 7.2%. However, this increase is probably due to changes in testing methods and evaluation criteria.

In North America, prior to the 1950s, group A β-hemolytic streptococcus (GAS) was the most common pathogen associated with neonatal sepsis prior to the 1960s. In the past twenty years, the most common pathogen causing sepsis is coagulase-negative staphylococci that exist as biofilms associated with infected central venous or arterial catheters. Infections can be fatal and contribute to long-term morbidity and disability among the infants who survive into childhood. Neonatal sepsis effects 128 cases per 1000 live births. Meningitis can occur in the septic infant. Expectant mothers with HSV have a 75% chance of at least one flare-up during their pregnancy. In limited studies it was found that infants in Africa born to mothers with malaria have a 7% of acquiring congenital malaria.

=== Early-onset infections ===
Early onset sepsis can occur in the first week of life. It usually is apparent on the first day after birth. This type of infection is usually acquired before the birth of the infant. Premature rupture of membranes and other obstetrical complications can add to the risk of early-onset sepsis. If the amniotic membrane has been ruptured greater than 18 hours before delivery the infant may be at more risk for this complication. Prematurity, low birth weight, chorioamnionitis, maternal urinary tract infection and/or maternal fever are complications that increase the risk for early-onset sepsis. Early onset sepsis is indicated by serious respiratory symptoms. The infant usually develops pneumonia, hypothermia, or shock. The mortality rate is 30 to 50%.

=== Late onset infections ===
Infections that occur after the first week of life but before the age of 30 days are considered late onset infections. Obstetrical and maternal complications are not typically the cause of these late onset infections; they are usually acquired by the infant in the hospital neonatal intensive care unit. The widespread use of broad-spectrum antibiotics in the nursery intensive care unit can cause a higher prevalence of invasive antibiotic resistant bacteria. Meconium aspiration syndrome has a mortality rate just over 4%. This accounts for 2% for all neonatal deaths.

== Research ==
The susceptibility to risk of infection and immune deficiencies are active areas of research. Studies regarding the role of viruses in neonatal infections are lacking. Research also continues into the role and protective effect of gut, skin and other human microbiomes and the colonization during the neonatal period. The comparison between both resource rich and poor countries makes it difficult to compare the diagnosis success; as industrialized regions are able to confirm the diagnosis and presence of pathogens in the clinical laboratory. Clinical testing may not be available in all settings and clinicians must rely on the signs of infection in the newborn. Research data from Africa and Southeast Asia is scarce.

The result of some research has been the identification of diagnostic tools and procedures that could identify mothers with group B streptococcus infection in resource-poor regions. These procedures would be easy and inexpensive to use. Those mothers who are identified as being infected could then be prophylactly treated prior to the birth of the baby.

Probiotic administration of Lactobacillus species has shown some success.

A GBS vaccine is currently being tested but not currently available. Vaccination is estimated to being able to prevent 4% of GBS infections for preterm births and 60–70% for neonatal GBS infections in the US. The projected benefits of maternal vaccination is the prevention of 899 cases of GBS disease and 35 deaths among infants. The cost savings in the prevention of GBS may be over 43 million dollars. Vaccination may be especially beneficial in low to middle income countries where screening and prophylactic treatment is not possible. Analysts project that GBS vaccination would prevent 30–54% of infant GBS cases. Screening, prophylactic antibiotics and vaccine would prevent 48% of infection.

== See also ==
- Preterm birth
