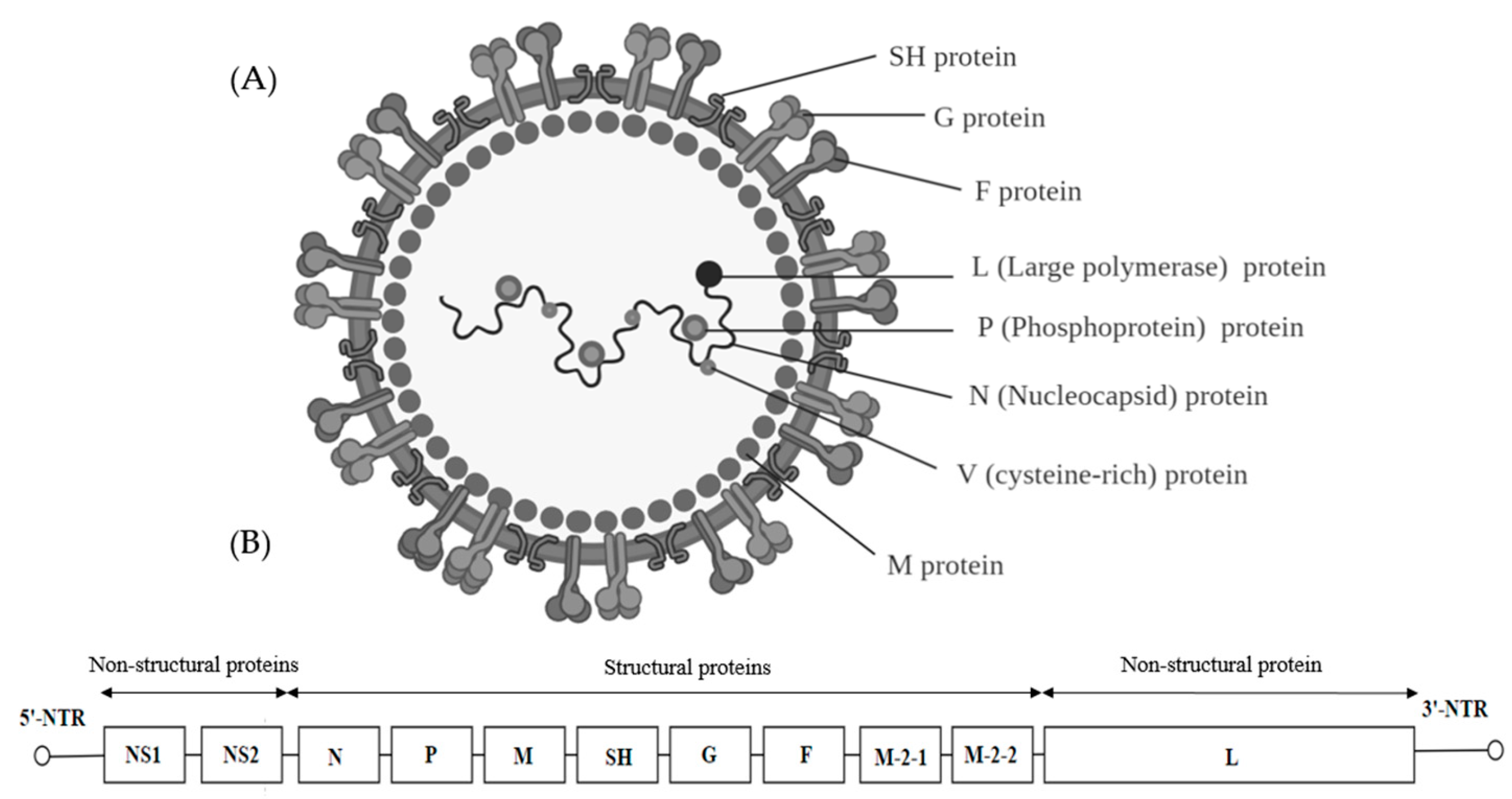
- Pneumovirus structure and genome
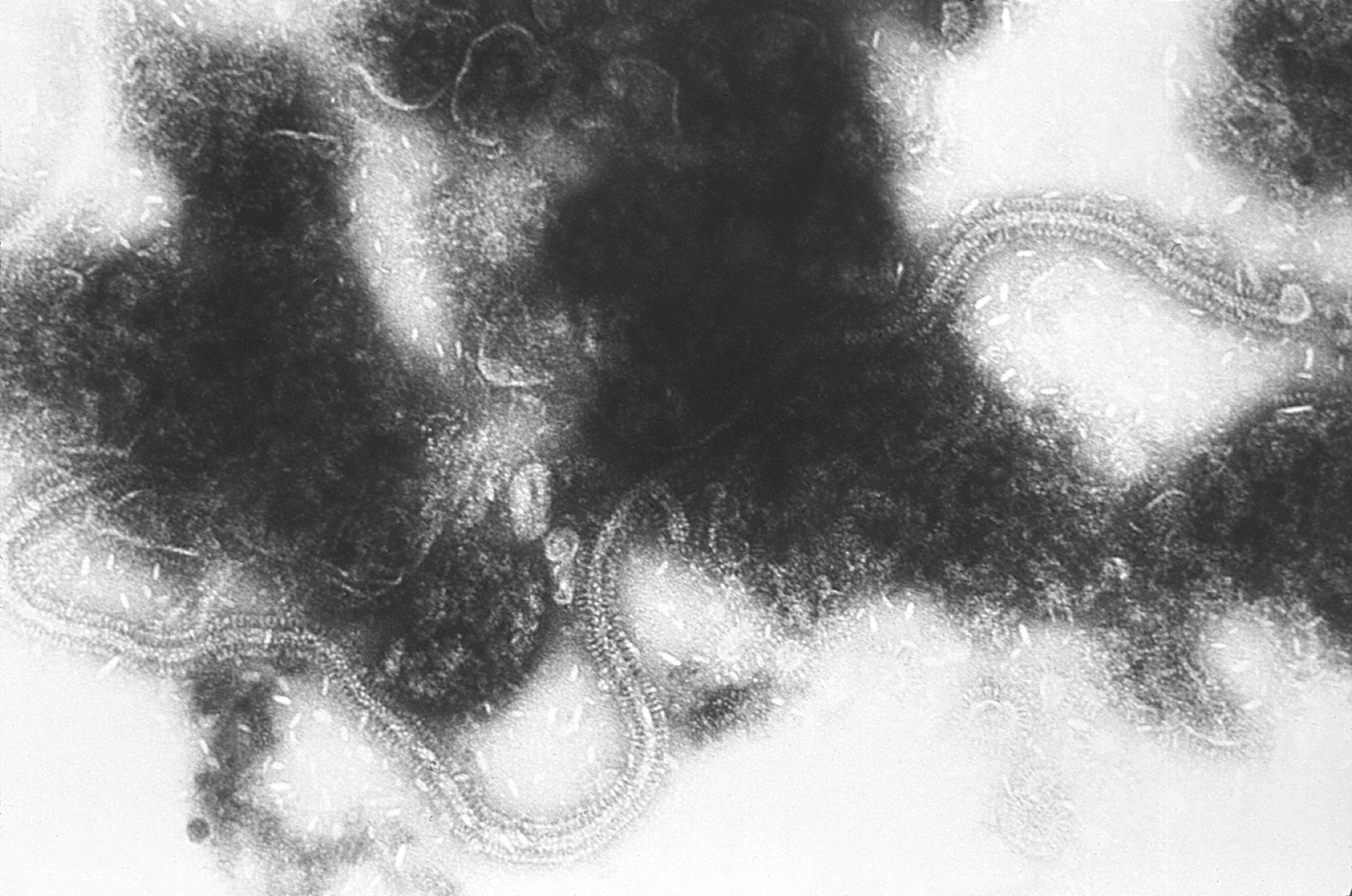
- Transmission electron micrograph of Respiratory syncytial virus

Virus classification
- (unranked): Virus
- Realm: Riboviria
- Kingdom: Orthornavirae
- Phylum: Negarnaviricota
- Class: Monjiviricetes
- Order: Mononegavirales
- Family: Pneumoviridae
- Genus: Orthopneumovirus

Species
- See text

= Orthopneumovirus =

Genus of viruses

The genus Orthopneumovirus consists of pathogens that target the upper respiratory tract within their specific hosts. Every orthopneumovirus is characterized as host-specific, and has a range of diseases involved with respiratory illness. Orthopneumoviruses can cause diseases that range from a less-severe upper-respiratory illness to severe bronchiolitis or pneumonia. Orthopneumoviruses are found among sheep, cows, and most importantly humans. In humans, the orthopneumovirus that specifically impacts infants and small children is known as human respiratory syncytial virus.

== Taxonomy ==
Genus Orthopneumovirus: species and their viruses
Genus	Species	Virus (Abbreviation)
Orthopneumovirus	Orthopneumovirus bovis	Bovine respiratory syncytial virus (BRSV)
Orthopneumovirus	Orthopneumovirus hominis	human respiratory syncytial virus A2 (HRSV-A2)
Orthopneumovirus	Orthopneumovirus hominis	human respiratory syncytial virus B1 (HRSV-B1)
Orthopneumovirus	Orthopneumovirus muris	murine pneumonia virus (MPV)

== Symptoms ==
Mild symptoms may include rhinitis, coughing, and decreased appetite. More serious symptoms include wheezing, difficulty breathing, fever, bronchiolitis and pneumonia.

== Diagnosis ==
Transmission of an infectious agent by another person or animal can be through blood, needles, blood transfusion, a mother to fetus, coughing, sneezing, saliva, or air transmission. Healthcare providers will determine the severity of the virus and possible treatment options. Healthcare providers will also decide if hospitalization is needed for more intense cases.

== Treatment ==
Treatment plans are not specific and are based upon a specific host's current symptoms. Pain relievers or nonsteroidal anti-inflammatory drugs such as acetaminophen or ibuprofen can be prescribed. Isolation is the first course of action for the infected host. In more serious cases hospitalization may be necessary and supplemental oxygen may be used to aid in oxygen intake. In severe viral detection, intubation and the use of a mechanical ventilation will be inserted as a breathing apparatus.

== Prevention ==
The best methods of prevention of orthopneumovirus infection are covering cough and sneezing to prevent transmission of possible pathogens. Isolating animals and humans that have a pneumovirus is the best way to prevent the virus from spreading. Molecular studies have been on the rise due to continuing materials and information obtained regarding recombinant DNA arrangements that might offer a foundation for vaccine development. Currently animals are able to receive vaccines specific to their virus strand. During cold and peak flu season, infants and small children have the option to receive monthly injections of small medication doses at a weak strength to help prevent virus/ host attachment.

== Cases ==
Human respiratory syncytial virus (HRSV) is the most known orthopneumovirus because of its direct correlation and importance in humans. RSV is the leading viral agent among pneumoviruses in pediatric upper respiratory diseases globally. New pneumoviruses have been discovered in the Netherlands among 28 children according to studies. Certain studies have isolated the children in hospitals to identify specific causes, contagion levels, and treatment options among those children.
