= Charles Hoover =

Charles Hoover may refer to:

- Charlie Hoover (baseball) (1865–1905), catcher in Major League Baseball
- Charles Franklin Hoover (1865–1927), American physician
