= Ingavirin =

Identifiers
- IUPAC name: 5-[2-(1H-imidazol-5-yl)ethylamino]-5-oxopentanoic acid
- CAS Number: 219694-63-0
- PubChem CID: 9942657
- DrugBank: DB11944
- ChemSpider: 8118269
- UNII: 3CM03MUJ69
- KEGG: C11250
- ChEMBL: ChEMBL4297291
- CompTox Dashboard (EPA): DTXSID90433141
- ECHA InfoCard: 100.234.559

Chemical and physical data
- Formula: C_{10}H_{15}N_{3}O_{3}
- Molar mass: 225.248 g·mol^{−1}
- 3D model (JSmol): Interactive image
- SMILES: C1=C(NC=N1)CCNC(=O)CCCC(=O)O
- InChI: InChI=1S/C10H15N3O3/c14-9(2-1-3-10(15)16)12-5-4-8-6-11-7-13-8/h6-7H,1-5H2,(H,11,13)(H,12,14)(H,15,16); Key:KZIMLUFVKJLCCH-UHFFFAOYSA-N

Ingavirin (Ingamine, Vitavirin) is an antiviral drug developed in Russia, with activity against respiratory viruses such as influenza, COVID-19, and human metapneumovirus.
