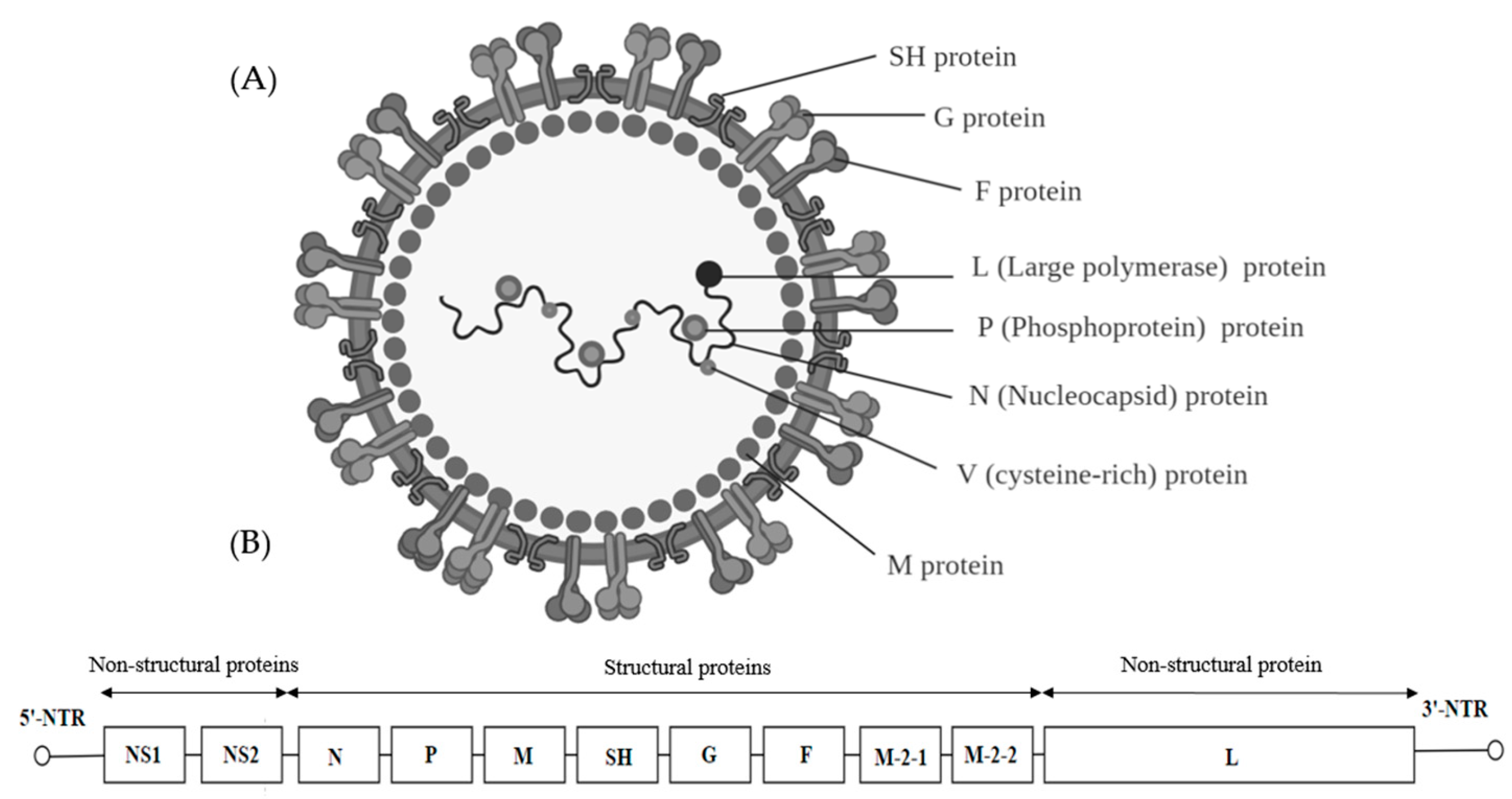
- Pneumovirus structure and genome
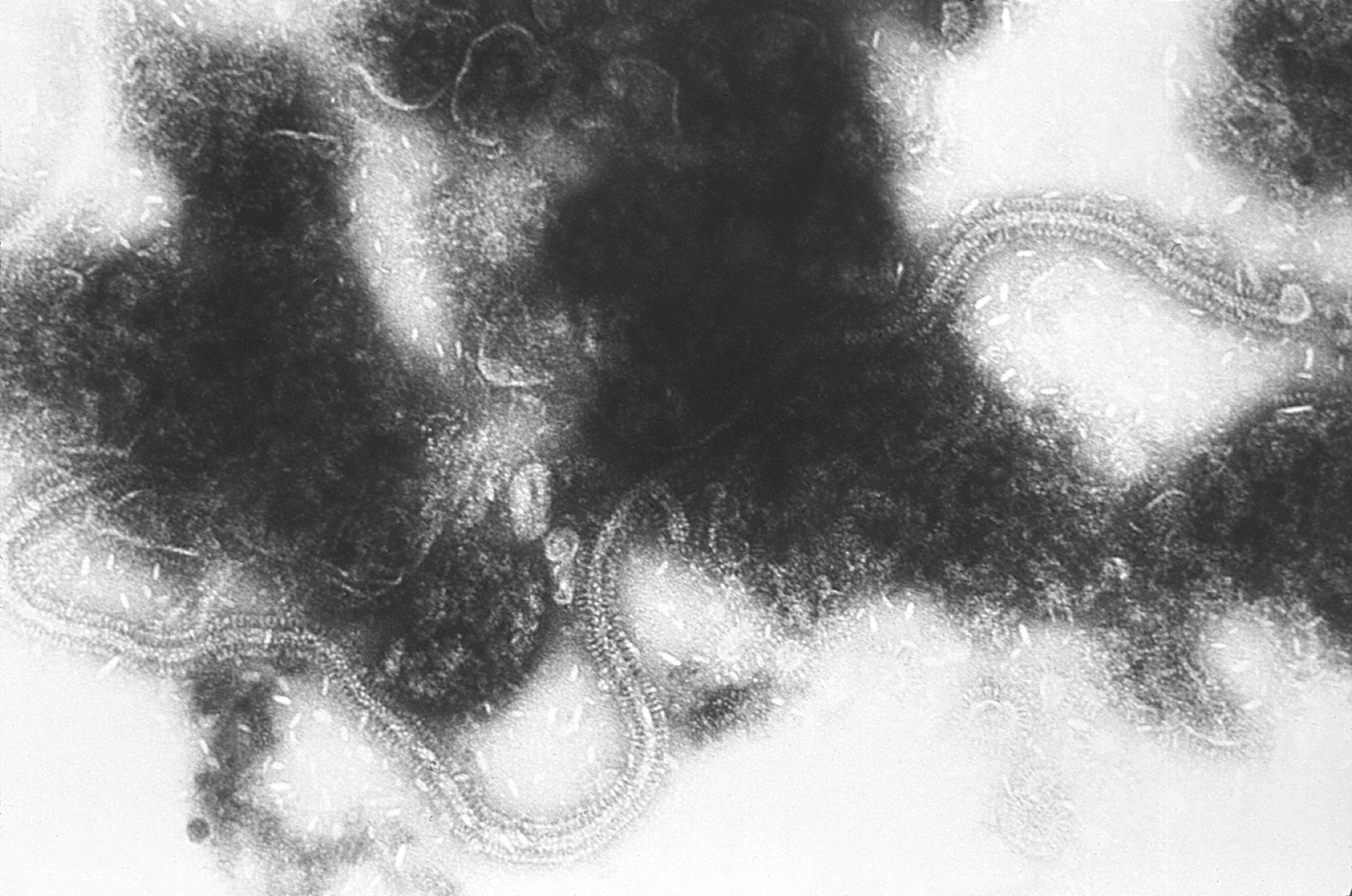
- Transmission electron micrograph of Human orthopneumovirus

Virus classification
- (unranked): Virus
- Realm: Riboviria
- Kingdom: Orthornavirae
- Phylum: Negarnaviricota
- Class: Monjiviricetes
- Order: Mononegavirales
- Family: Pneumoviridae

Genera
- Metapneumovirus; Orthopneumovirus

= Pneumoviridae =

Family of viruses

Pneumoviridae (from Greek pneumo- 'lung' + -viridae 'virus', from Latin, 'poison, slimy liquid') is a family of negative-strand RNA viruses in the order Mononegavirales. Humans, cattle, and rodents serve as natural hosts. Respiratory tract infections are associated with member viruses such as human respiratory syncytial virus. There are five species in the family which are divided between the genera Metapneumovirus and Orthopneumovirus. The family used to be considered as a sub-family of Paramyxoviridae, but has been reclassified as of 2016.

== Virology ==
=== Structure ===
Pneumoviruses are pleomorphic, capable of producing spherical and filamentous, enveloped virions (virus particles) that vary in size from 150 to 200 nm in diameter. The nucleocapsid consisting of a protein shell and viral nucleic acids has a helical symmetry. Nucleocapsids have a diameter of 13.5 nm and a helical pitch of 6.5 nm.

=== Genome ===
The genome is composed of negative-sense, single-stranded RNA that is non-segmented. It is about 15 kbp in size, and encodes eleven proteins. A unique feature of the genome is the M2 gene, which encodes proteins M2-1 and M2-2. The pneumovirus M2-1 protein is distinctive, and no homologue has been found in any other virus families. It functions as a processivity factor for the virus RNA-dependent RNA polymerase, and promotes viral RNA synthesis. Viruses in this family are often associated with respiratory infections, and are transmitted through respiratory secretions.

=== Proteins ===
N – Nucleocapsid protein. Essential for viral replication and transcription. Plays a major role in forming a capsid around the viral genome.

P – Phosphoprotein required for replication. Facilitates RNA-dependent RNA polymerase attachment and recruits M2 protein.

M1 – Matrix protein. Facilitates nucleocapsid and envelope interactions.

M2-1 – Matrix protein. Intragenic and intergenic transcription factor required for mRNA transcript elongation. Binds to nascent and provides stability in order to prevent premature termination.

M2-2 – Matrix protein. Involved in regulating transcription and replication. When over expressed, has been shown to inhibit viral replication.

F – Fusion protein. Type I glycoprotein that facilitates fusion between the virus and the host cell membrane.

SH – Small hydrophobic protein. Non essential. Exact function is unknown. Suggested to alter membrane permeability and block apoptosis.

G – Type II glycoprotein. Facilitates virus attachment through interactions with glycosaminoglycans.

L – RNA dependent RNA polymerase. Required for replication. Adds a methylated guanosine cap and poly(A) tail to nascent mRNA.

=== Replication ===
Pneumoviruses replicate in the cytoplasm of the host cell. First, the virus binds to HN glycoprotein receptors expressed on the surface of the cell. Then, through the action of the fusion protein, the virus fuses to the host plasma membrane and the nucleocapsid is released. Prior to undergoing replication, mRNA is transcribed and viral proteins are translated. Transcription is dependent on virally encoded RNA-dependent-RNA-polymerase, which binds the genome at the 3' leader region and then sequentially transcribes each gene. Translation of viral proteins is carried out by host cell ribosomes. Once sufficient P, N, L, and M2 proteins are available to create a capsid around the newly replicated genome, the virus undergoes replication. After replication, the P, L, and M proteins participate in forming the ribonucleocapsid. Once virion assembly is complete, the virion egresses by budding out of the cell.

== Infection in humans ==
Human metapneumovirus (HMPV) was first classified as a pneumovirus in 2001. It is a negative-strand RNA virus that is the second most common cause of lower respiratory infection in young children. Pneumoviruses are intermediate in size between viruses of the families Paramyxoviridae and Orthomyxoviridae. Cytoplasmic inclusions are considerably denser than those of other viruses in the family. Human metapneumovirus infection is very similar to the common cold but can be serious enough to cause influenza-like illness. It will typically occur in the winter and early spring. This specific infection is most common in children, especially under the age of five. Common signs and symptoms include a runny nose, nasal congestion, sore throat, cough, headache, body aches, and fever, which can be seen in many other viral respiratory infections. More severe signs and symptoms may include chest pain, wheezing due to inflammation and tightening of the small airways in the lungs, shortness of breath, dizziness, severe fatigue, dehydration, pneumonia, or a persistent fever. It typically resolves within a week. If seen in the elderly there is cause for concern, as it can develop into pneumonia.

== Taxonomy ==
Family Pneumoviridae: genera, species, and their viruses
Genus	Species	Virus (Abbreviation)
Metapneumovirus	Metapneumovirus avis	avian metapneumovirus (AMPV)
Metapneumovirus	Metapneumovirus hominis	human metapneumovirus (HMPV)
Orthopneumovirus	Orthopneumovirus bovis	bovine respiratory syncytial virus (BRSV)
Orthopneumovirus	Orthopneumovirus hominis	human respiratory syncytial virus A2 (HRSV-A2)
Orthopneumovirus	Orthopneumovirus hominis	human respiratory syncytial virus B1 (HRSV-B1)
Orthopneumovirus	Orthopneumovirus muris	murine pneumonia virus (MPV)
