= Avian metapneumovirus =

Virus classification
- (unranked): Virus
- Realm: Riboviria
- Kingdom: Orthornavirae
- Phylum: Negarnaviricota
- Class: Monjiviricetes
- Order: Mononegavirales
- Family: Pneumoviridae
- Genus: Metapneumovirus
- Species: Metapneumovirus avis

Synonyms
- Turkey rhinotracheitis virus

Species of virus

Avian metapneumovirus (aMPV), also known as turkey rhinotracheitis or swollen head syndrome, causes a variety of disease syndromes in birds, depending on the bird species and virus type (A, B, C or D).

First detected in 1978 in South Africa, the virus has spread all over the world except Australia. It is mostly found in turkeys, pheasants, Muscovy ducks and guinea fowls. Turkeys are the most susceptible species for all subtypes. It is presumed that other species are immune.

== Etiology ==
AMPV belongs to the genus Metapneumovirus alongside human metapneumovirus, both of which belong to the family Pneumoviridae.

The spherical formed particles are 100 to 500 nm in diameter and the filamentous formed are 100 nm in width. Most of the particles are not highly pleomorphic but rounded.

The virus is divided into four subtypes from A to D, which can be classified by the attachment of glycoprotein (G-protein).

Subtypes A, B and D are more closely related in Europe than to the subtype C. By comparison type C has a higher amino acid sequence homology to human MPV. HMPV and AMPV-C share up to 80% of the amino acid identity. The genomes are arranged " from the 3′ to 5′ ends encoding nucleoprotein (N), phosphoprotein (P), matrix protein (M), fusion protein (F), […]" second Matrix (M2) "small hydrophobic protein (SH), attachment protein (G) and the large polymerase protein (L)" (3′–N-P-M-F- M2-SH-G-L-5′-). Other viruses from the genus Metapneumovirus include the same genome arrangement. In comparison, AMPV-C shares only 60-70% of the amino acid identity with AMPV-A and AMPV-B.

The glycoproteins F and G, which are forming spikes on the surface of the virus, interact with the protein layer of the glycoprotein M on the internal surface. The detailed molecular reaction of them is not well investigated.

Reliant to strain, temperature and time of exposure, AMPV is capable of resisting a pH from 3 to 9. The virus is inactivated at 56 °C (133 °F) after 30 minutes, and is destroyed by commonly used disinfectants.

== Signs and symptoms ==
Even though younger birds appear to be more susceptible, the infection affects all ages. For fattening turkeys it dominantly concerns the upper respiratory tract while for laying hens it is a mild respiratory infection which leads to a dipping production of eggs, which can decrease up to 70%.

Other symptoms includes “serous, watery nasal and ocular discharge; frothy eyes; and conjunctivitis. At later stages, signs include mucopurulent, turbid nasal discharge; plugged nostrils; swollen infraorbital sinuses; and snicking, sneezing, coughing," "or tracheal rales. These respiratory signs are accompanied by depression, anorexia, and ruffled feathers”

The incubation needs 3 to 5 days and morbidity can reach 100% but depending on the age, constitution of the flock and secondary infections the mortality accounts 1 to 30% by turkeys.

So clear identifying signs have not been identified in chickens or pheasants. Infection with the virus is associated with swollen head syndrome, with swelling peri- and infraorbital sinuses, foamy eyes, nasal discharge. In general, less than 40% of the flock becomes infected, and the mortality is around 2%. Young chickens become depressed or crowd together under heating lamps. Flocks become quiet after infection.

If there is no secondary infection and the flock is in good condition, birds can recover within 7–10 days.

== Diagnosis ==
AMPV can be clearly diagnosed by laboratory test to identify viral genomes, antigens or antibodies. There are various tests:

- Antigen determination
- Virus isolation
- Reverse transcriptase PCR as well as real-time RT-PCR
- Antibody determination through virus neutralisation test or ELISA test

For virus isolation, samples of the upper respiratory tract must be taken in an early stage of the disease, before the sixth day after infection.

== Transmission ==
AMPV is highly contagious mainly through oral transmission in direct contact or in contact with contaminated material. The spreading depends on the flock density, the standard of hygiene and the biosecurity within the flocks. The virus is replicated in the reproductive and also respiratory system. The virus is mostly transmitted through aerosol and therefore affects the ciliated epithelial cells of the respiratory system but also macrophages can be affected and play a minor role in transmitting the virus.

The virus can be spread after only a few days after the infection which suggests that this virus has no latency period.

Because of the human MPV, found in 2001, it is not defined as zoonotic. Even though there is a great homology between hMPV and aMPV-C, no infections of the aMPV-C in humans have been noticed. Also the hMPV does not replicate in turkeys.

So far there is not close relationship noticed between hMPV and aMPV-A and aMPV-B.

== Prevention ==
To protect the flocks live vaccines, including attenuated as well as inactivated, are used in Europe to control subtypes A and B. Three methods are used to treat the flock:

- Oculo-nasal method
- spray vaccination
- drinking water vaccination (less reliable)

For inactivated vaccines, the animal should be primed with live vaccines 4–6 weeks prior to treatment with the inactivated vaccine. Inactivated vaccines are administered via injection.

In general the vaccination program depends on the field situation.

To reduce the seriousness of the disease, good flock management is necessary. High biosecurity means that there is limited and controlled access to the flock, separate footwear and equipment for each building, and footbaths in the building entrance. For a hygienic environment, the organic material should be removed, both in gangway and drinking water but also disinfectants play a major role.

== History ==
The type D virus was detected 1986 by B. Giraud in France.
