= Bovine respiratory syncytial virus =

Virus classification
- (unranked): Virus
- Realm: Riboviria
- Kingdom: Orthornavirae
- Phylum: Negarnaviricota
- Class: Monjiviricetes
- Order: Mononegavirales
- Family: Pneumoviridae
- Genus: Orthopneumovirus
- Species: Orthopneumovirus bovis

Respiratory virus of cattle

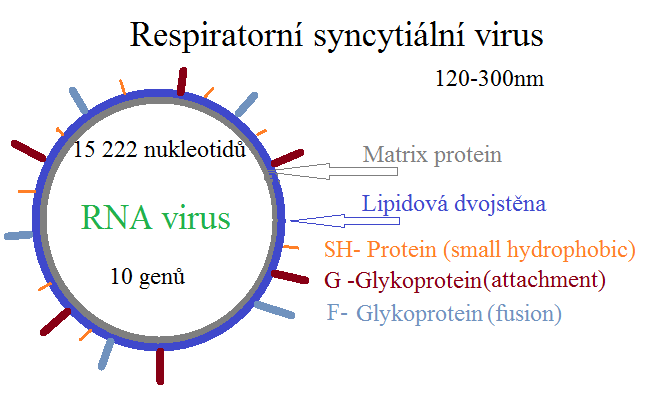
BRSV diagram

Bovine respiratory syncytial virus (BRSV) is pneumovirus closely related to human respiratory syncytial virus (RSV) that is a common cause of respiratory disease in cattle, particularly calves. It is a negative-sense, single-stranded RNA virus that replicates in the cytoplasm of the cell. Similarly to other single-stranded RNA viruses, the genome of BRSV has a high mutation rate, which results in great antigenetic variation. Thus, BRSV can be split into four different subgroups based on antigen expression (A, B, AB, and intermediate).

== Causes ==
In around 90% of cases, infection with BRSV results in secondary bacterial pneumonia due to interference with the host's immune system and enhancement of bacterial adherence and colonisation by the virus. Pasteurella multocida, a common commensal of the nasopharynx of cattle, appears to be the main bacterial agent in BRSV-related bovine respiratory disease (BRD).

== Treatment ==
Similarly to other viral infections, treatment of BRSV is typically supportive. Anti-inflammatory drugs may be required to reduce fever and inflammation, which may increase the affected animal's food and water intake. Non-steroidal anti-inflammatory drugs (NSAIDs) are preferred to corticosteroids due to the latter's immunosuppressive effects. In the case of a secondary bacterial infection, antimicrobials may be given. While commercial BRSV vaccines are available, appropriate biosecurity measures and animal husbandry may be sufficient to prevent spread of disease.
