= Hoover's sign (leg paresis) =

- Differential diagnosis: Conversion disorder

Hoover’s sign of leg paresis is one of two signs named for Charles Franklin Hoover. It is a maneuver aimed to separate organic from non-organic paresis of the leg. The sign relies on the principle of synergistic contraction.

== Description ==
Involuntary extension of the "normal" leg occurs when flexing the contralateral leg against resistance. To perform the test, the examiner should hold one hand under the heel of the "normal" limb and ask the patient to flex the contralateral hip against resistance (while the patient is supine), asking the patient to keep the weak leg straight while raising it.

== Interpretation ==
If the patient is making an honest effort, the examiner should feel the "normal" limb's heel extending (pushing down) against his or her hand as the patient tries to flex (raise) the "weak" leg's hip. Feeling this would indicate an organic cause of the paresis. If the examiner does not feel the "normal" leg's heel pushing down as the patient flexes the hip of the "weak" limb, then this suggests functional weakness (sometimes called "conversion disorder"), i.e. that effort is not being transmitted to either leg.

Alternatively, if a patient reports weakness of hip extension, and appears to have weakness upon direct testing of hip extension, Hoover's test can also be applied. If an examiner places one hand behind the heel of the patient's weak leg and asks her or him to push against it, no movement will be felt. If the patient is asked to raise the other leg (i.e. flexion at the contra-lateral hip), the examiner will feel pressure on his or her hand as the patient involuntarily extends the weak hip. This can be pointed out to the patient in a non-confrontational manner, to help persuade the patient of the functional nature of the weakness. In the context of a positive Hoover's sign, functional weakness (or "conversion disorder") is much more likely than malingering or factitious disorder.

Strong hip muscles can make the test difficult to interpret.

Efforts have been made to use the theory behind the sign to report a quantitative result.

== See also ==
- Hoover's sign (pulmonary)
