= Bronchiolitis =

Inflammation of the small airways in the lungs

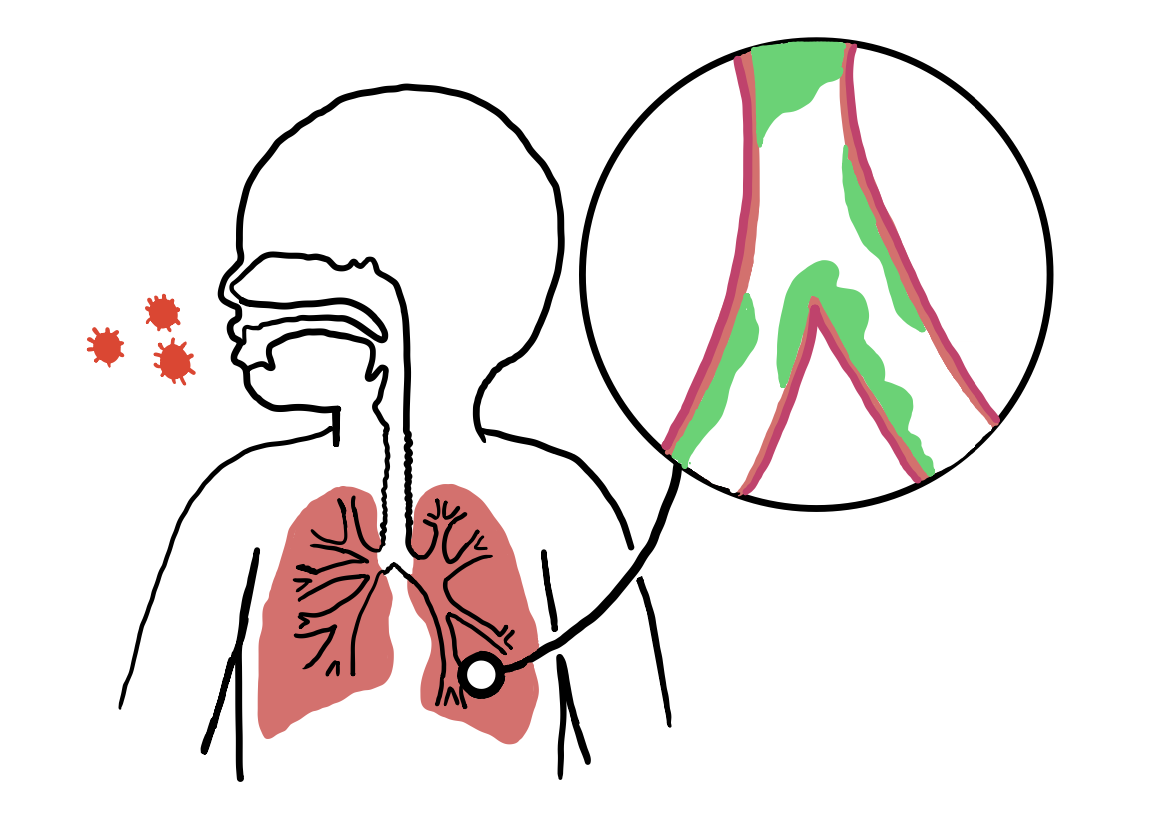
- Depiction of the location of bronchiolitis in the lungs and viral shedding.
- Specialty: Emergency medicine, pediatrics
- Symptoms: Fever, cough, runny nose, wheezing, breathing problems
- Complications: Shortness of breath, dehydration
- Usual onset: Less than 2 years old
- Causes: Viral disease (respiratory syncytial virus, human rhinovirus)
- Diagnostic method: Based on symptoms
- Differential diagnosis: Asthma, pneumonia, heart failure, allergic reaction, cystic fibrosis
- Treatment: Symptomatic treatment (oxygen, support with feeding, intravenous fluids)
- Frequency: ~20% (children less than 2)
- Deaths: 1% (among those hospitalized)

Bronchiolitis is inflammation of the small airways also known as the bronchioles in the lungs. Acute bronchiolitis is caused by a viral infection, usually affecting children younger than two years of age. Symptoms may include fever, cough, runny nose or rhinorrhea, and wheezing. More severe cases may be associated with nasal flaring, grunting, or respiratory distress. If the child has not been able to feed properly due to the illness, signs of dehydration may be present.

Chronic bronchiolitis is more common in adults and has various causes, one of which is bronchiolitis obliterans. Often when people refer to bronchiolitis, they are referring to acute bronchiolitis in children.

Acute bronchiolitis is usually the result of viral infection by respiratory syncytial virus (RSV) (59.2% of cases) or human rhinovirus (19.3% of cases). Diagnosis is generally based on symptoms. Tests such as a chest X-ray or viral testing are not routinely needed, but may be used to rule out other diseases.

There is no specific medication that is used to treat bronchiolitis. Symptomatic treatment at home is generally effective and most children do not require hospitalization. This can include antipyretics such as acetaminophen for fever and nasal suction for nasal congestion, both of which can be purchased over the counter. Occasionally, hospital admission for oxygen, particularly high flow nasal cannula, or intravenous fluids is needed in more severe cases of disease.

Video explanation

About 10% to 30% of children under the age of two years are affected by bronchiolitis at some point in time. It commonly occurs in the winter season in the Northern Hemisphere. It is the leading cause of hospitalizations in those less than one year of age in the United States. The risk of death among those who are admitted to hospital is extremely low at about 1%. Outbreaks of the condition were first described in the 1940s.

== Signs and symptoms ==
Bronchiolitis typically presents in children under two years old and is characterized by symptoms of a respiratory illness, sometimes referral to as a viral prodrome.

Wheezing
Wheezing heard in the lungs of an adult using a stethoscope. Similar sounds might be heard in a child with bronchiolitis.

Signs of the disease include:

- fever
- rhinorrhea
- cough
- wheeze
- mild tachypnea or increased breathing

Some signs of severe disease include:

- increased work of breathing (such as use of accessory muscles of respiration, rib & sternal retraction, tracheal tug)
- severe chest wall recession (Hoover's sign)
- presence of nasal flaring and/or grunting
- severe tachypnea or increased breathing
- hypoxia (low oxygen levels)
- cyanosis (bluish skin)
- lethargy and decreased activity
- poor feeding (less than half of usual fluid intake in preceding 24 hours)

These symptoms can develop over one to three days. Crackles or wheeze are typical findings on listening to the chest with a stethoscope. Wheezes can occasionally be heard without a stethoscope. The child may also experience apnea, or brief pauses in breathing, but this can occur due to many conditions that are not just bronchiolitis. After the acute illness, it is common for the airways to remain sensitive for several weeks, leading to recurrent cough and wheeze.

== Causes ==
Bronchiolitis is most commonly caused by respiratory syncytial virus (RSV, also known as human pneumovirus). Other agents that cause this illness include, but are not limited to, human metapneumovirus, influenza, parainfluenza, coronavirus, adenovirus, rhinovirus and mycoplasma.

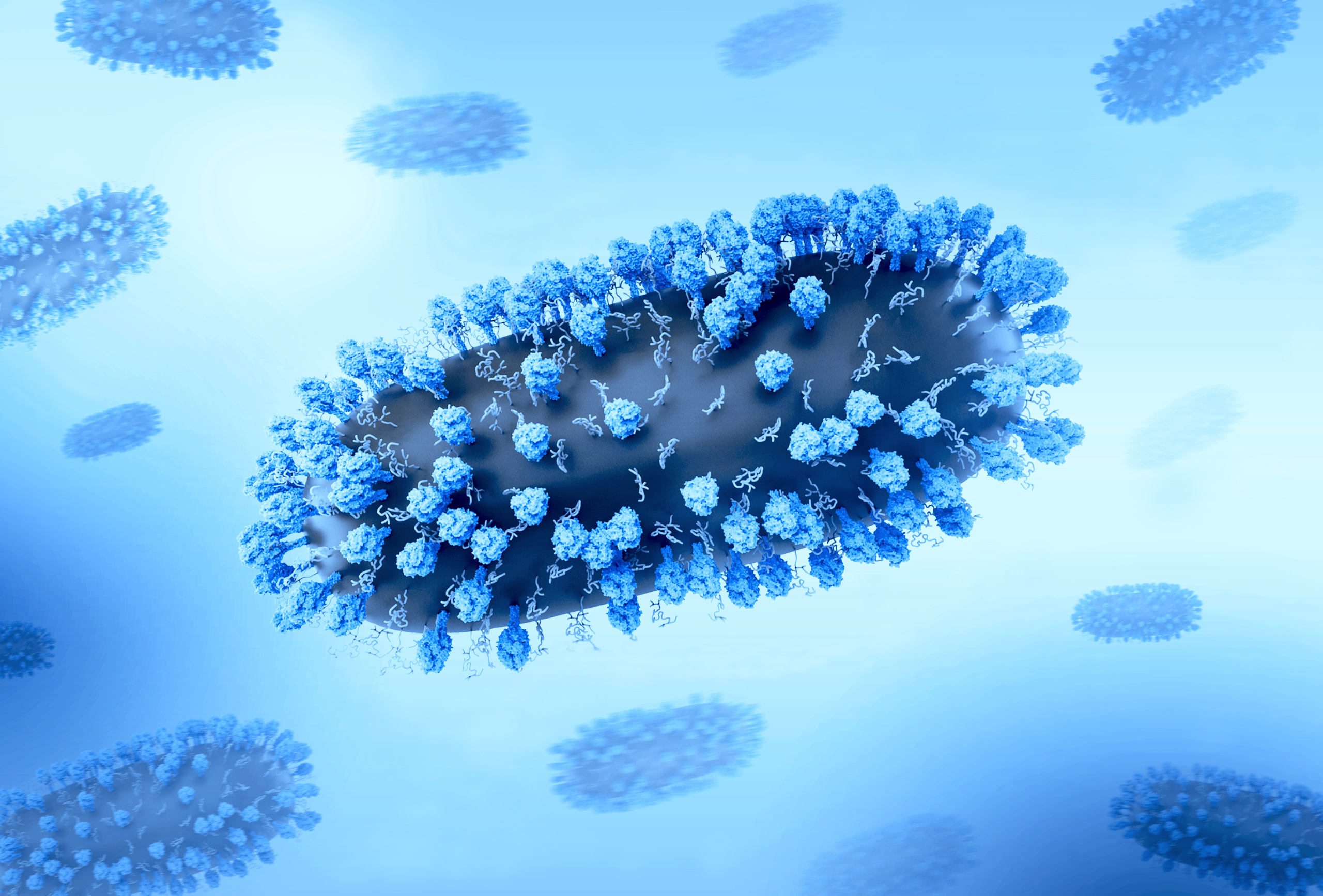
RSV, which is the most common cause of acute bronchiolitis in children.

=== Risk factors ===
Children are at an increased risk for progression to severe respiratory disease if they have any of the following additional risk factors:

- Preterm infant (gestational age less than 37 weeks)
- Younger age at onset of illness (less than 3 months of age)
- Congenital heart disease
- Immunodeficiency
- Chronic lung disease
- Neurological disorders
- Tobacco smoke exposure

Targeted, community-led, co-produced interventions to alleviate the healthcare burdens of bronchiolitis have been shown to be effective.

== Diagnosis ==
The diagnosis is typically made by a provider through clinical history and physical exam. Chest X-ray is sometimes useful to exclude bacterial pneumonia, but not indicated in routine cases. Chest x-ray may also be useful in people with impending respiratory failure. Additional testing such as blood cultures, complete blood count, and electrolyte analyses are not recommended for routine use although may be useful in children with multiple comorbidities or signs of sepsis or pneumonia. Electrolyte analyses may be performed if there is concern for dehydration.

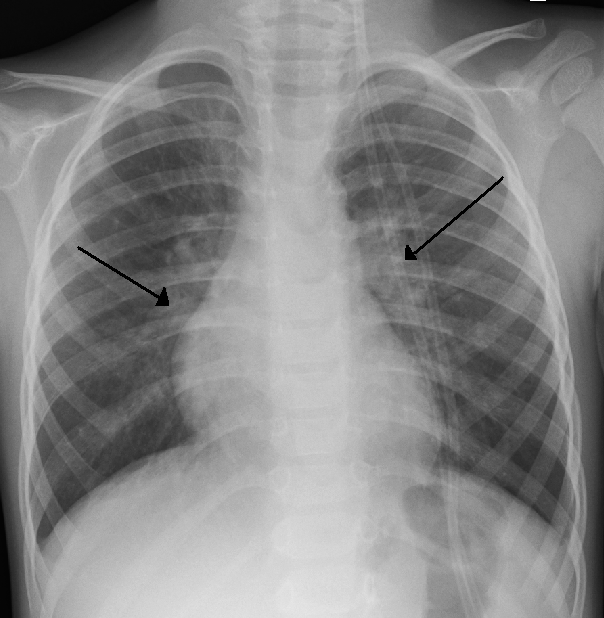
An X-ray of a child with RSV showing the typical bilateral perihilar fullness of bronchiolitis. The arrows are pointing to the portion of the X-ray that is abnormal and shows fluffy perihilar fullness.

Testing for the specific viral cause can be done but has little effect on management and thus is not routinely recommended. The COVID pandemic has led to more viral testing to exclude COVID as a cause of the infection. At that point providers often also add on a flu and RSV test for completeness. RSV testing by direct immunofluorescence testing of a swab of the nose had a sensitivity of 61% and specificity of 89%, so it is not always accurate. Identification of those who are RSV-positive can help providers recommend isolation precautions in the hospital or at home to avoid the infection spreading to others. Identification of the virus may help reduce the use of antibiotics because antibiotics are not recommended for viral illnesses such as bronchiolitis.

It is uncommon for infants with bronchiolitis to be co-infected with a bacterial illness. Infants with bronchiolitis between the age of two and three months have a second infection by bacteria (usually a urinary tract infection) less than 6% of the time. When further evaluated with a urinalysis, infants with bronchiolitis had an accompanying UTI 0.8% of the time.

=== Differential diagnosis ===
There are many childhood illnesses that can present with respiratory symptoms, particularly persistent cough, runny nose, and wheezing. Bronchiolitis may be differentiated from some of these by the characteristic pattern of preceding febrile upper respiratory tract symptoms lasting for 1 to 3 days with associated persistent cough, increased work of breathing, and wheezing. However, some infants may present without fever (30% of cases) or may present with apnea without other signs or with poor weight gain prior to onset of symptoms. In such cases, additional laboratory testing and radiographic imaging may be useful. The following are some other diagnoses to consider in an infant presenting with signs of bronchiolitis:

- Upper Respiratory Infection
- Asthma and reactive airway disease
- Bacterial pneumonia
- Whooping cough
- Foreign body aspiration
- Congenital heart disease
- Allergic reaction
- Vascular ring
- Heart failure
- Cystic fibrosis
- Chronic pulmonary disease

== Prevention ==
Prevention of bronchiolitis relies strongly on measures to reduce the spread of the viruses that cause respiratory infections (that is, handwashing, and avoiding exposure to those symptomatic with respiratory infections). Guidelines are mixed on the use of gloves, aprons, or personal protective equipment.

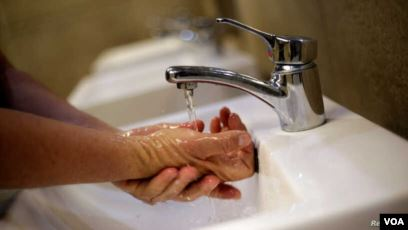
Handwashing can help reduce the spread of bronchiolitis.

One way to improve the immune system is to feed the infant with breast milk, especially during the first month of life. Respiratory infections were shown to be significantly less common among breastfed infants and fully breastfed RSV-positive hospitalized infants had shorter hospital stays than non or partially breastfed infants. Guidelines recommend exclusive breastfeeding for infants for the first 6 months of life to avoid infection with bronchiolitis.

The US Food and Drug Administration (FDA) has currently approved two RSV vaccines for adults ages 60 and older, Arexvy (GSK plc) and Abrysvo (Pfizer). Abrysvo is also approved for "immunization of pregnant individuals at 32 through 36 weeks gestational age for the prevention of lower respiratory tract disease (LRTD) and severe LRTD caused by respiratory syncytial virus (RSV) in infants from birth through 6 months of age." It is unclear how effective these vaccines will be in preventing infection with bronchiolitis since they are new, although the FDA has approved them due to the clear benefit that they have shown in clinical trials.

Nirsevimab, a monoclonal antibody against RSV, is approved by the FDA for all children younger than 8 months in their first RSV season. Additionally, children aged 8 to 19 months who are at increased risk may be recommended to receive Nirsevimab as they enter their second RSV season if they have increased risk factors for infection with RSV.

A second monoclonal antibody, Palivizumab, can be administered to prevent bronchiolitis to infants less than one year of age that were born prematurely and that have underlying heart disease or chronic lung disease of prematurity. Otherwise healthy premature infants that were born after a gestational age of 29 weeks should not be administered Palivizumab, as the harms outweigh the benefits.

Tobacco smoke exposure has been shown to increase both the rates of lower respiratory disease in infants, as well as the risk and severity of bronchiolitis. Tobacco smoke lingers in the environment for prolonged periods and on clothing even when smoking outside the home. Guidelines recommend that parents be fully educated on the risks of tobacco smoke exposure on children with bronchiolitis.

== Management ==
Treatment of bronchiolitis is usually focused on the hydration and symptoms instead of the infection itself since the infection will run its course. Complications of bronchiolitis are typically from the symptoms themselves. Without active treatment, cases resolved in approximately eight to fifteen days. Children with severe symptoms, especially poor feeding or dehydration, may be considered for hospital admission. Oxygen saturation under 90%-92% as measured with pulse oximetry is also frequently used as an indicator of need for hospitalization. High-risk infants, apnea, cyanosis, malnutrition, and diagnostic uncertainty are additional indications for hospitalization.

Most guidelines recommend sufficient fluids and nutritional support for affected children along with frequent nasal suctioning. Measures for which the recommendations were mixed include nebulized hypertonic saline, nebulized epinephrine, and chest physiotherapy. Treatments which the evidence does not support include salbutamol, steroids, antibiotics, antivirals, and heliox.

=== Outpatient management ===
==== Nutrition ====
Maintaining hydration is an important part of management of bronchiolitis. Infants with mild pulmonary symptoms may require only observation if feeding is unaffected. However, oral intake may be affected by nasal secretions and increased work of breathing. Poor feeding or dehydration, defined as less than 50% of usual intake, is often cited as an indication for hospital admission.

==== Breathing/ oxygen ====
Children must be closely monitored for changes in ability to breathe. Nasal suction can be used at home in order to decrease nasal congestion and open the airways.

Inadequate oxygen supply to the tissue is one of the main concerns during severe bronchiolitis and oxygen saturation is often closely associated with both the need for hospitalization and continued length of hospital stay in children with bronchiolitis. However, oxygen saturation is a poor predictor of respiratory distress. Accuracy of pulse oximetry is limited in the 76% to 90% range and there is weak correlation between oxygen saturation and respiratory distress as brief hypoxemia is common in healthy infants. Additionally, pulse oximetry is associated with frequent false alarms and parental stress and fatigue.

==== Nasal suction ====
Infants are nose breathers and bronchiolitis causes congestion of the airways with secretions that can make it difficult to feed and breathe. Nasal suctioning is a very common supportive measure used at home to decrease nasal congestion. It has not been extensively studied in the literature, but can be used to decrease secretions in the nose and has been proven mildly effective in one experimental trial. A nasal suction bulb can be purchased over the counter and directions for its use can be explained by a provider or on the back of the box. Clinical guidelines state that routine suctioning is safe and can provide relief for infants which allows them to eat and sleep more comfortably.

In those same clinical guidelines, it is stated that deep suctioning, which is often performed in the hospital is not recommended as it may lead to increased length of hospital stay in children with bronchiolitis.

=== Inpatient/hospital management ===
==== Nutrition/fluid therapy ====
When children are experiencing poor feeding or dehydration, the child may be admitted to the hospital. Approximately 50% of infants who are hospitalized due to bronchiolitis require fluid therapy. There are two main approaches to fluid therapy: intravenous (IV) fluid therapy and enteral tube fluid therapy (nasogastric or orogastric). Both approaches to fluid therapy are associated with a similar length of hospital stay. Enteral tube fluid therapy may reduce the risk of local complications, but the evidence for or against each approach is not clear. The risk of health care caused hyponatremia and fluid retention are minimal with the use of isotonic fluids such as normal saline.

==== Oxygen ====
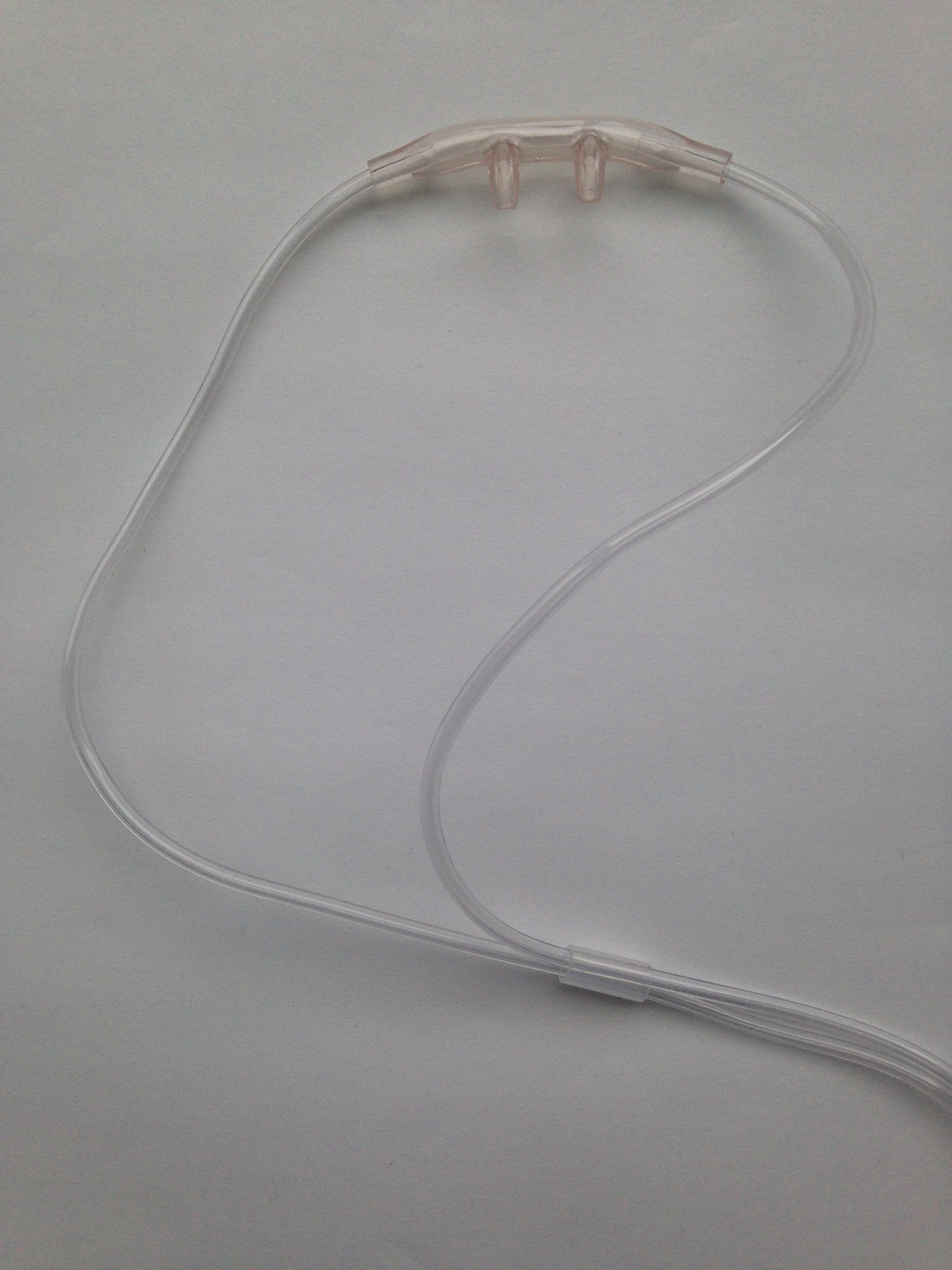
Nasal cannula

If children are having trouble maintaining their oxygen saturations on room air, clinicians may choose to give additional oxygen to children with bronchiolitis if their oxygen saturation is below 90%. Additionally, clinicians may choose to use continuous pulse oximetry in these people to monitor them.

The use of humidified, heated, high-flow nasal cannula may be a safe initial therapy to decrease work of breathing and need for intubation. High flow nasal cannula may still be used in severe cases prior to intubation. The use of CPAP has very limited evidence for improving breathing (a decreased respiratory rate) and does not reduce the need for mechanical ventilation.

Blood gas testing is not routinely recommended for people hospitalized with the disease. However, people with severe worsening respiratory distress or impending respiratory failure may be considered for capillary blood gas testing.

=== Contradicting evidence ===
==== Hypertonic saline ====
Guidelines recommend against the use of nebulized hypertonic saline in the emergency department for children with bronchiolitis but it may be given to children who are hospitalized.

Nebulized hypertonic saline (3%) has limited evidence of benefit and previous studies lack consistency and standardization. It does not reduce the rate of hospitalization when therapy is given in the emergency department or outpatient setting. A 2017 review found tentative evidence that it reduces the risk of hospitalization, duration of hospital stay, and improved the severity of symptoms. Side effects were mild and resolved spontaneously.

==== Bronchodilators ====
Guidelines recommend against the use of bronchodilators in children with bronchiolitis as evidence does not support a change in outcomes with such use. Additionally, there are adverse effects to the use of bronchodilators in children such as tachycardia and tremors, as well as adding increased cost to the medical visit.

Several studies have shown that bronchodilation with β-adrenergic agents such as salbutamol may improve symptoms briefly but do not affect the overall course of the illness or reduce the need for hospitalization.

However, there are conflicting recommendations about the use of a trial of a bronchodilator, especially in those with history of previous wheezing. Bronchiolitis-associated wheezing is likely not effectively alleviated by bronchodilators anyway as it is caused by airway obstruction and plugging of the small airway diameters by luminal debris, not bronchospasm as in asthma-associated wheezing that bronchodilators usually treat well. If a clinician is concerned that reactive airway disease or asthma may be a component of the illness, a bronchodilator may be administered.

Anticholinergic inhalers, such as ipratropium bromide, have a modest short-term effect at best and are not recommended for treatment.

==== Epinephrine ====
The current state of evidence suggests that nebulized epinephrine is not indicated for children with bronchiolitis except as a trial of rescue therapy for severe cases.

Epinephrine is an α and β adrenergic agonist that is used to treat other upper respiratory tract illnesses, such as croup, as a nebulized solution. Current guidelines do not support the outpatient use of epinephrine in bronchiolitis given the lack of substantial sustained benefit.

A 2017 review found inhaled epinephrine with corticosteroids did not change the need for hospitalization or the time spent in hospital. Other studies suggest a synergistic effect of epinephrine with corticosteroids but have not consistently demonstrated benefits in clinical trials. Guidelines recommend against its use currently.

=== Non-effective treatments ===
- Ribavirin is an antiviral drug which does not appear to be effective for bronchiolitis.
- Antibiotics are often given in case of a bacterial infection complicating bronchiolitis, but have no effect on the underlying viral infection and their benefit is not clear. The risks of bronchiolitis with a concomitant serious bacterial infection among hospitalized febrile infants is minimal and work-up and antibiotics are not justified. Azithromycin adjuvant therapy may reduce the duration of wheezing and coughing in children with bronchiolitis but has not effect on length of hospital stay or duration of oxygen therapy.
- Corticosteroids, although useful in other respiratory disease such as asthma and croup, have no proven benefit in bronchiolitis treatment and are not advised. Additionally, corticosteroid therapy in children with bronchiolitis may prolong viral shedding and transmissibility. The overall safety of corticosteroids is questionable.
- Leukotriene inhibitors, such as montelukast, have not been found to be beneficial and may increase adverse effects.
- Immunoglobulins are of unclear benefit.

=== Experimental trials ===
Currently other medications do not yet have evidence to support their use, although they have been studied for use in bronchiolitis. Experimental trials with novel antiviral medications in adults are promising but it remains unclear if the same benefit will be present.

- Surfactant had favorable effects for severely critical infants on duration of mechanical ventilation and ICU stay however studies were few and small.
- Chest physiotherapy, such as vibration or percussion, to promote airway clearance may slightly reduce duration of oxygen therapy but there is a lack of evidence that demonstrates any other benefits. People with difficulty clearing secretions due to underlying disorders such as spinal muscle atrophy or severe tracheomalacia may be considered for chest physiotherapy.
- Heliox, a mixture of oxygen and the inert gas helium, may be beneficial in infants with severe acute RSV bronchiolitis who require CPAP but overall evidence is lacking.
- DNAse has not been found to be effective but might play a role in severe bronchiolitis complicated by atelectasis.
- There are no systematic reviews or controlled trials on the effectiveness of nasal decongestants, such as xylometazoline, for the treatment of bronchiolitits.
- Overall evidence is insufficient to support the use of alternative medicine. There is tentative evidence for Chinese herbal medicine, vitamin D, N-acetylcysteine, and magnesium but this is insufficient to recommend their use.

== Epidemiology ==
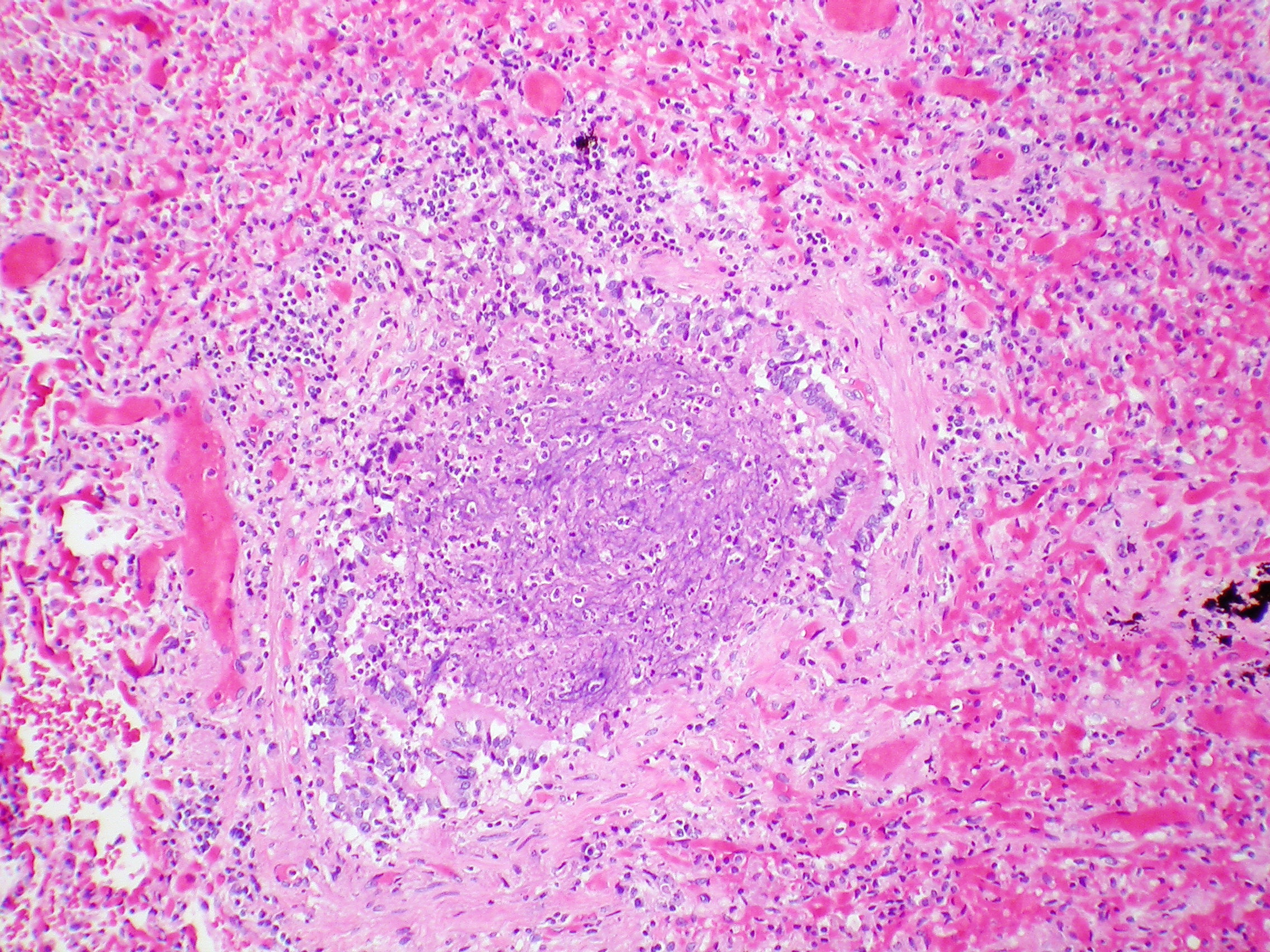
Histology Slide - Acute inflammatory exudate occluding the lumen of the bronchiole and acute inflammation of part of the wall of the bronchiole. It shows at the cellular level the inflammation that occurs in the bronchiole of a child with bronchiolitis.

Bronchiolitis typically affects infants and children younger than two years, principally during the autumn and winter. It is the leading cause of hospital admission for respiratory disease among infants in the United States and accounts for one out of every 13 primary care visits. Bronchiolitis accounts for 3% of emergency department visits for children under 2 years old. Bronchiolitis is the most frequent lower respiratory tract infection and hospitalization in infants worldwide.

=== COVID-19 pandemic ===
The COVID-19 pandemic rapidly changed the transmission and presentation starting in late 2019. During the pandemic, there was a sharp decrease in cases of bronchiolitis and other respiratory illness, which is likely due to social distancing and other precautions. After social distancing and other precautions were lifted, there was increases in the cases of RSV and bronchiolitis worldwide to varying degrees. There is unclear evidence on how COVID-19 will affect bronchiolitis moving forward. Recent evidence suggests that bronchiolitis still poses a large disease burden to both primary care providers and emergency departments, and seasonality of the disease has re-emerged. Before, during, and after the pandemic bronchiolitis cases clusters consistently emerged in poorer areas.
