= Hoover's sign (pulmonary) =

Clinical sign of obstructive airway disease

Hoover's sign in pulmonology is one of two signs named after Charles Franklin Hoover (1865–1927), an American physician based in Cleveland. It refers to the paradoxical inward movement of the lower rib cage, particularly the costal margins, during inspiration, instead of the normal outward expansion. The sign is most commonly associated with COPD and indicates altered chest wall mechanics due to lung hyperinflation.

== History ==
Hoover described the sign in 1920 in a paper titled "The Diagnostic Significance of Inspiratory Movements of the Costal Margins", published in The American Journal of the Medical Sciences. He detailed the paradoxical inward retraction of the lower rib margins during inspiration as a key finding in patients with advanced emphysema and chronic bronchitis, linking it to the mechanical effects of a flattened diaphragm. Earlier descriptions of abnormal chest wall motion in obstructive lung disease had been made by other clinicians, but it was Hoover who systematically characterised the sign and its relationship to diaphragmatic mechanics.

== Mechanism ==
In healthy individuals, the costal margin exhibits little motion during quiet breathing; when it does move, it moves outward and upward. In COPD, and more specifically emphysema, air trapping during expiration leads to hyperinflation of the lungs. This elevates the resting lung volume and flattens the diaphragm. The flattened diaphragm has an increased radius of curvature, which increases muscle tension and reduces the zone of apposition between the diaphragm and the chest wall. As a result, the force vector of diaphragmatic contraction on the lower ribs shifts from an outward, cephalad direction to an inward one, pulling the inferior ribs paradoxically inward during inspiration.

== Clinical significance ==
Hoover's sign is a frequent finding in COPD. One study found it present in up to 77% of patients with airway obstruction, while another reported a prevalence of 45% overall in stable COPD patients, increasing from undetectable in mild disease to 36% in moderate, 43% in severe, and 76% in very severe (GOLD stage 4) disease. Its presence is associated with greater severity of dyspnoea at rest and during exercise, higher frequency of hospitalisations and emergency department visits, and increased frequency of COPD exacerbations, independent of the patient's FEV_{1} and body mass index. The sign can therefore help identify COPD patients who have more severe symptoms and require greater healthcare resources.

Although most closely associated with COPD, the sign can also be present in severe asthma, congestive heart failure, severe pneumonia (particularly in children), and bronchiolitis. It may also appear unilaterally in diaphragmatic paralysis, pleural effusion, and pneumothorax.

== Diagnostic accuracy ==
In a study of 172 patients assessed by both a family medicine resident and a pulmonologist, Hoover's sign had a sensitivity of 58% and a specificity of 86% for detecting obstructive airway disease (defined as FEV1/FVC ratio < 0.70), with a positive likelihood ratio of 4.16 — higher than other physical signs examined. Inter-observer agreement for the sign was good (κ = 0.74).

== See also ==
- Hoover's sign (leg paresis)
