= Metapneumovirus =

- Human metapneumovirus (hMPV) structure and genome

Virus classification
- (unranked): Virus
- Realm: Riboviria
- Kingdom: Orthornavirae
- Phylum: Negarnaviricota
- Class: Monjiviricetes
- Order: Mononegavirales
- Family: Pneumoviridae
- Genus: Metapneumovirus

Species
- Metapneumovirus avis; Metapneumovirus hominis

Genus of viruses in the family Pneumoviridae

Metapneumovirus is a genus of viruses in the family Pneumoviridae.

Human metapneumovirus (hMPV) is a common cause of morbidity and mortality, especially for patients with a weakened immune system as well as older adults.

== Taxonomy ==
The genus contains the following two species, listed by scientific name and followed by the exemplar virus of the species:

- Metapneumovirus avis, Avian metapneumovirus
- Metapneumovirus hominis, Human metapneumovirus

== Other species ==
By "reverse zoonosis" the virus can be passed from humans to other primates, such as chimpanzees. These infections can also be deadly for the animals.
