= Charles Franklin Hoover =

American physician

Charles Franklin Hoover (1865–1927) was an American physician born in Cleveland, Ohio, who read medicine at Harvard University. He worked in Vienna under Neusser, and in Strasbourg with F Kraus before returning to Cleveland. He was appointed Professor of Medicine in 1907. His main interests were in diseases of the diaphragm, lungs, and liver.

Two medical signs are named for him:

- Hoover's sign (leg paresis)
- Hoover's sign (pulmonary)
