= Human metapneumovirus =

- Human metapneumovirus (hMPV) structure and genome

Virus classification
- (unranked): Virus
- Realm: Riboviria
- Kingdom: Orthornavirae
- Phylum: Negarnaviricota
- Class: Monjiviricetes
- Order: Mononegavirales
- Family: Pneumoviridae
- Genus: Metapneumovirus
- Species: Metapneumovirus hominis

Species of virus

Human metapneumovirus (HMPV or hMPV) is a negative-sense single-stranded RNA virus of the family Pneumoviridae and is closely related to the avian metapneumovirus (AMPV) subgroup C. It was isolated for the first time in 2001 in the Netherlands by using the RAP-PCR (RNA arbitrarily primed PCR) technique for the identification of unknown viruses growing in cultured cells. As of 2016, it was the second most common cause—after respiratory syncytial virus (RSV)—of acute respiratory tract illness in otherwise-healthy children under the age of 5 in a large US outpatient clinic.

The peak age of hospitalization for infants with HMPV is between 6 and 12 months, slightly older than the peak of RSV, which is around 2 to 3 months. The clinical features and severity of HMPV are similar to those of RSV. HMPV is also an important cause of disease in older adults and infants.

== Taxonomy ==
Genus Metapneumovirus: species and their viruses
Genus	Species	Virus (abbreviation)	NCBI taxonomy ID
Metapneumovirus	Metapneumovirus avis	avian metapneumovirus (AMPV)	38525
Metapneumovirus	Metapneumovirus hominis	human metapneumovirus (HMPV)	162145

== Discovery and naming ==
Human metapneumovirus (HMPV) was first discovered in 2001 in the Netherlands by Bernadette G. van den Hoogen and her colleagues. HMPV was first detected in the respiratory secretions of 28 young children in the Netherlands and had initially stood out from other common respiratory viruses because the testing methods van den Hoogen and her colleagues had tried using—immunological assays using virus-specific antibodies and PCR-based methods using virus genome-specific primers—were able to test only for known respiratory viruses and, therefore, were unable to identify the novel virus.

When researchers began applying molecular biology techniques, the genetic characteristics and portions of the genomic sequences of the virus could be identified. These techniques included the randomly primed PCR technique, which obtained the limited sequence data needed to reveal a clear relationship between this new virus and the avian pneumovirus. The new virus, human metapneumovirus, is named for its close relationship to AMPV, indicating its identity as a metapneumovirus and its human host.

== Epidemiology ==
HMPV was responsible for 12% of cases of acute respiratory tract illness in otherwise-healthy children in a US outpatient clinic and 15% and 8% of cases (respectively) of community-acquired pneumonia requiring hospitalization in children under and over the age of 5 in the United States in 2010–2012. The virus is distributed worldwide and, in temperate regions, has a seasonal distribution generally following that of RSV and influenza viruses during late winter and spring. Serologic studies have shown that by the age of five, virtually all children worldwide have been exposed to the virus. Despite near universal infection during early life, reinfections are common in older children and adults.

HMPV may cause mild upper respiratory tract infection (e.g., the common cold). However, premature infants, immunocompromised persons, and older adults >65 years are at risk for severe disease and hospitalization. In some studies of hospitalizations and emergency room visits, HMPV is nearly as common and severe as influenza in older adults. HMPV is associated with more severe disease in people with asthma and adults with chronic obstructive pulmonary disease (COPD). Numerous outbreaks of HMPV have been reported in long-term care facilities for children and adults, causing fatalities.Symptoms include rhinorrhea, nasal congestion, cough, wheezing and sore throat.

== Genome ==
Model structure and proteins encoded by Human Metapneumovirus (hMPV). (a) hMPV model structure indicating viral proteins encoded by (b) the viral genome.

The genomic organisation of HMPV is similar to RSV; however, HMPV lacks the non-structural genes, NS1 and NS2, and the HMPV antisense RNA genome contains eight open reading frames in slightly different gene order than RSV (viz. 3’-N-P-M-F-M2-SH-G-L-5’). HMPV is genetically similar to the avian metapneumoviruses A, B and in particular type C. Phylogenetic analysis of HMPV has demonstrated the existence of two main genetic lineages termed subtype A and B containing within them the subgroups A1/A2 and B1/B2 respectively. Genotyping based on sequences of the F and G genes showed that subtype B was associated with increased cough duration and increased general respiratory systems compared to HMPV-A.

== Life cycle and reproduction ==
hMPV is estimated to have a 3–6 day incubation period and is often most active during the later winter and spring seasons in temperate climates, overlapping with the RSV and influenza seasons and possibly allowing for repeated infection. As of 2012, hMPV and its replication cycle were not well understood. Some of the principal steps of hMPV's replication cycle were studied with experiments based on the viral life cycles and reproductive measures of the rest of the Paramyxoviridae family.

The first step of the hMPV replication cycle is attachment to the host cell, specifically the epithelial cells of the respiratory tract, using the G protein. This G protein contains a hydrophobic region that acts as an uncleaved signal peptide and a membrane anchor to facilitate its binding; however, because recombinant viruses that lack the G protein have still been able to replicate in vitro and in vivo, it seems that attachment via the G protein is not required for rest of the replication cycle.

Next in the cycle is the fusion of the viral and host membranes which is likely mediated by the F protein. Though the fusion mechanism is very similar to that of other Paramyxoviridae family members and involves conformational changes of the F protein, the mechanism for hMPV does not depend on the G protein for fusion like its family members, showing consistency with the previously mentioned idea that the G protein is not necessary for subsequent steps of the hMPV replication cycle. The fusion function of the F protein has been proven by its ability to bind to host cells via integrin αvβ1 using an Arginine-Glycine-Aspartate (RGD) motif, which is speculated to be the trigger for membrane fusion events.

One main difference between hMPV and other Paramyxoviridae viruses' fusion mechanisms though is that hMPV's fusion events occur at acidic pH levels while other viruses' fusion events occur at neutral pH levels; however, more research needs to be conducted in this area to get a better understanding of what is different about the hMPV fusion mechanism and why. Although its specific function is uncertain, the presence of the SH glycoprotein does not appear to have any effects on replication kinetics, cytopathic effects, or plaque formation of hMPV.

After fusion, the viral ribonucleoprotein (RNP) containing negative-sense viral RNA (vRNA) genome is released into the cytoplasm and acts as a template for mRNA and antigenomic cRNA synthesis. From here, most knowledge about hMPV transcription is derived from what is already know about RSV and other Paramyxoviridae viruses, including that leader and trailer sequences in the genome are partially complementary and act as promoters for transcription. Proteins N, P, and L dissociate from the vRNA and bind to each other to form the polymerase complex so that the genomic RNA can act as a matrix for viral transcription and replication in the cytoplasm.

The final step in the replication process of hMPV that is relatively certain is the journeying of the envelope glycoproteins (F, G, and SH) to zones of membranous accumulation via the Golgi apparatus to be exposed at the surface of infected cells. This allows infected cells to merge with adjacent cells through the action of viral fusion proteins on the surface, effectively spreading the virus's genome. The rest of the replication cycle following RNA and viral protein synthesis are unclear and require further research.

== Virology ==
HMPV infects airway epithelial cells in the nose and lung. HMPV is thought to attach to the target cell via the glycoprotein (G) protein interactions with heparan sulfate and other glycosaminoglycans. The HMPV fusion (F) protein encodes an RGD (Arg-Gly-Asp) motif that engages RGD-binding integrins as cellular receptors, then mediates fusion of the cell membrane and viral envelope in a pH-independent fashion, likely within endosomes. HMPV then induces the response of chemokines and cytokines such as IL-6, IFN-alpha, TNF-alpha, IL-2, and macrophage inflammatory proteins, which in turn leads to peribronchiolar and perivascular infiltration and inflammation.Human metapneumovirions have a mean diameter of 209 nm.

== Detection ==
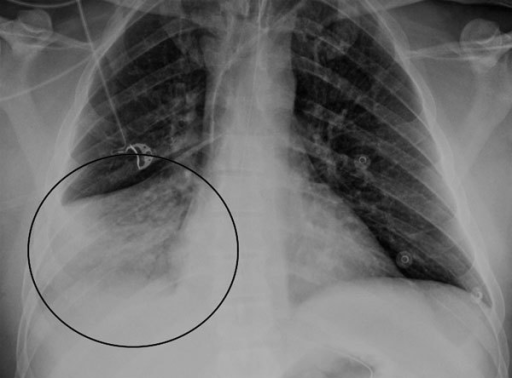
Frontal chest radiograph of a 47-year-old with encephalitis-associated human metapneumovirus. Consolidation in the right middle lobe (circle) indicating pneumonia.

The identification of HMPV has predominantly relied on reverse-transcriptase polymerase chain reaction (RT-PCR) technology to amplify directly from RNA extracted from respiratory specimens. Alternative more cost-effective approaches to the detection of HMPV by nucleic acid-based approaches have been employed and these include:

1. detection of hMPV antigens in nasopharyngeal secretions by immunofluorescent-antibody test
2. the use of immunofluorescence staining with monoclonal antibodies to detect HMPV in nasopharyngeal secretions and shell vial cultures
3. immunofluorescence assays for detection of hMPV-specific antibodies
4. the use of polyclonal antibodies and direct isolation in cultured cells.

== Distribution and hosts ==
Though hMPV was first discovered and identified in 2001, serological studies showed that hMPV, or a close relative of it, had already been circulating for at least 50 years. From this information, it is clear that the virus had not just "jumped" from birds, or some other animal reservoir, to humans shortly before its discovery.

As of 2022, peak infection from hMPV in the northern hemisphere is in late winter and early spring, but it can be found globally across all continents and its distribution is very complex and dynamic. Researchers have found that hMPV is mostly localized and can differ significantly from community to community, allowing for the possibility of the strain in one location one year to be most similar to the strain in a different location the next year.

This phenomenon has been recorded with the virus strains in Australia in 2001; in France in 2000 and 2002; in Canada in 1999, 2000, 2001, and 2002; in Israel in 2002; and in the Netherlands in 2001 all being very closely related based on their F gene sequences. There are at least two major genotypes of hMPV (A and B) that circulate during community outbreaks and each genotype has two of its own, but as of now, it seems that no one strain is dominant over the others and none of them are known to cause varying levels of severity.

HMPV is most likely spread from infected individuals to others through 1. secretions from coughing and sneezing, 2. close personal contact (ex. touching, shaking hands, etc), and 3. touching objects with viruses on them then touching your mouth, nose, or eyes. As of 2023, development of a reliable antiviral therapy treatment or vaccine to prevent the spread of hMPV has yet to occur, but there does seem to be promising developments in that area. In some vaccine trials, researchers have observed how a live recombinant human parainfluenza virus that contains the hMPV F gene can induce hMPV-specific antibodies and can protect experimental animals from hMPV.

Another similar study demonstrated how a chimeric bovine/human parainfluenza virus 3 expressing the hMPV F gene allows for neutralizing antibodies against both parainfluenza and hMPV. These experiments have several limitations, including their small-population animal models. Overall, while vaccines and antiviral therapy treatments are in the works, the biggest difficulty that researchers face as of 2006 is the limited data available about the development of hMPV in the natural host.

== Transmission ==
It is likely that transmission occurs by contact with contaminated secretions, via droplet, aerosol, or fomite vectors. Hospital-acquired infections with human metapneumovirus have been reported. HMPV has been shown to circulate during autumn and winter months with alternating predominance of a single subtype each year.

== Treatment ==
No treatment for humans is known as of 2008. Ribavirin, a medication used to treat RSV, showed effectiveness in an animal model.

American pharmaceutical corporation Moderna conducted a clinical trial for a candidate modRNA vaccine against metapneumovirus. As of October 2019, the vaccine candidate had passed through phase I, with reports that the vaccine is well-tolerated at all dose levels at two months, and provokes an immune response which boosts the production of neutralising antibodies.

== Evolution ==
Human metapneumovirus was first reported in 2001 and avian metapneumovirus in the 1970s. There are at least four lineages of human metapneumovirus—A1, A2, B1 and B2. Avian metapneumovirus has been divided into four subgroups—A, B, C and D. Bayesian estimates suggest that human metapneumovirus emerged between 1875 and 1889 and diverged from avian metapneumovirus around 1800.

== 2024–2025 outbreak ==
The Chinese Center for Disease Control and Prevention published data showing that respiratory infections had risen significantly in the week of 16 to 22 December 2024; human metapneumovirus was linked to 6.2 percent of positive respiratory illness tests and 5.4 percent of respiratory-illness hospitalizations in China, more than COVID-19, rhinovirus, or adenovirus. Kan Biao, the head of the China CDC's National Institute for Communicable Disease Control and Prevention, announced that the rate of HMPV among children ages 14 and under was on the rise in China.
