= List of vaccine excipients =

This is a list of excipients per vaccine, as published by the United States Centers for Disease Control. Vaccine ingredients and production in other nations are substantially the same. Also listed are substances used in the manufacturing process.

Vaccine	Excipients
Adenovirus vaccine	This list refers to the type 4 and type 7 adenovirus vaccine tablets licensed in the US: Acetone, alcohol, anhydrous lactose, castor oil, cellulose acetate phthalate, dextrose, D-fructose, D-mannose, FD&C Yellow #6 aluminium lake dye, fetal bovine serum, human serum albumin, magnesium stearate, micro crystalline cellulose, plasdone C, Polacrilin potassium, potassium phosphate, sodium bicarbonate, sucrose
Anthrax vaccine (BioThrax)	Aluminium hydroxide, amino acids, benzethonium chloride, formaldehyde, inorganic salts and sugars, vitamins
BCG (Bacillus Calmette-Guérin) (Tice BCG)	Asparagine, citric acid, lactose, glycerin, iron ammonium citrate, magnesium sulfate, potassium phosphate
COVID-19 vaccines, mRNA-based (Pfizer-BioNTech COVID-19 Vaccine ) (Moderna COVID-19 Vaccine)	Lipids, salts, sucrose, plus in the Moderna COVID-19 Vaccine: tromethamine, acids and acid stabilizers
DTaP (Daptacel)	Aluminium phosphate, formaldehyde, Glutaraldehyde, 2-phenoxyethanol
DTaP (Infanrix)	Aluminium hydroxide, bovine extract, formaldehyde, glutaraldhyde, polysorbate 80
DTaP (Tripedia)	aluminium potassium sulfate, ammonium sulfate, bovine extract, formaldehyde, gelatin, peptone, polysorbate 80, sodium phosphate, thimerosal
DTaP-Hib (TriHIBit)	Aluminium potassium sulfate, ammonium sulfate, bovine extract, formaldehyde or formalin, gelatin, polysorbate 80, sucrose, thimerosal
DTaP-IPV (Kinrix)	Aluminium hydroxide, calf serum, formaldehyde, glutaraldehyde, lactalbumin hydrolysate, neomycin sulfate, polymyxin B, polysorbate 80
DTaP-HepB-IPV (Pediarix)	aluminium hydroxide, aluminium phosphate, calf serum, lactalbumin hydrolysate, formaldehyde, glutaraldhyde, neomycin sulfate, polymyxin B, polysorbate 80, yeast protein
DTaP-IPV-Hib (Pentacel)	aluminium phosphate, bovine serum albumin, formaldehyde, glutaraldehyde, MRC-5 cellular protein, neomycin, polymyxin B sulfate, polysorbate 80, 2-phenoxyethanol
DT vaccine (diphtheria vaccine plus tetanus vaccine) (Sanofi)	aluminium potassium sulfate, bovine extract, formaldehyde, thimerosal
DT vaccine (Massachusetts)	aluminium hydroxide, formaldehyde or formalin
Hib vaccine (ActHIB)	Ammonium sulfate, formaldehyde, sucrose
Hib vaccine (PedvaxHib)	aluminium hydroxyphosphate sulfate
Hib vaccine (Hiberix)	Formaldehyde, lactose
Hib-HepB (Comvax)	Amorphous aluminium hydroxyphosphate sulfate, amino acids, dextrose, formaldehyde, hemin chloride, mineral salts, nicotinamide adenine dinucleotide, potassium aluminium sulfate, sodium borate, soy peptone, yeast protein
Hepatitis A vaccine (Havrix)	aluminium hydroxide, amino acid supplement, formalin, MRC-5 cellular protein, neomycin sulfate, phosphate buffers, polysorbate 20
Hepatitis A vaccine (Vaqta)	Amorphous aluminium hydroxyphosphate sulfate, bovine albumin or serum, formaldehyde, MRC-5 cellular protein, sodium borate
Hepatitis B vaccine (Engerix-B)	aluminium hydroxide, phosphate buffers, yeast protein
Hepatitis B vaccine (Recombivax HB)	Amorphous aluminium hydroxyphosphate sulfate, amino acids, dextrose, formaldehyde, mineral salts, potassium aluminium sulfate, soy peptone, yeast protein
HepA-HepB vaccine (Twinrix)	aluminium hydroxide, aluminium phosphate, amino acids, formalin, MRC-5 cells, neomycin sulfate, phosphate buffers, polysorbate 20, yeast protein
Human papillomavirus (HPV) (Cervarix)	aluminium hydroxide, amino acids, lipids, mineral salts, sodium dihydrogen phosphate dehydrate, type 16 viral protein L1, type 18 viral protein L1, vitamins
Human papillomavirus (HPV) (Gardasil)	Amino acids, amorphous aluminium hydroxyphosphate sulfate, carbohydrates, L-histidine, mineral salts, polysorbate 80, sodium borate, vitamins, yeast protein
Influenza vaccine (Afluria)	Beta-propiolactone, calcium chloride, dibasic sodium phosphate, egg protein, monobasic potassium phosphate, monobasic sodium phosphate, neomycin sulfate, polymyxin B, potassium chloride, sodium taurodeoxychoalate, thimerosal (multi-dose vials only)
Influenza vaccine (Agriflu)	Egg proteins, formaldehyde, polysorbate 80, cetyltrimethylammonium bromide, neomycin sulfate, kanamycin
Influenza vaccine (Fluad)	Squalene, polysorbate 80, sorbitan trioleate, sodium citrate dehydrate, citric acid monohydrate, neomycin, kanamycin, barium, egg proteins, CTAB(cetyltrimethylammonium bromide), formaldehyde
Influenza vaccine (Fluarix)	Formaldehyde, octoxynol-10 (Triton X-100), α-tocopheryl hydrogen succinate, polysorbate 80 (Tween 80), hydrocortisone, gentamicin sulfate, ovalbumin, sodium deoxycholate, sucrose, phosphate buffer
Influenza vaccine (Flublok)	Monobasic sodium phosphate, dibasic sodium phosphate, polysorbate 20, baculovirus and host cell proteins, baculovirus and cellular DNA, Triton X-100, lipids, vitamins, amino acids, mineral salts
Influenza vaccine (Flucelvax)	Madin Darby Canine Kidney (MDCK) cell protein, MDCK cell DNA, polysorbate 80, cetyltrimethlyammonium bromide, β-propiolactone, phosphate buffer
Influenza vaccine (Flulaval)	Formaldehyde, á-tocopheryl hydrogen succinate, polysorbate 80, sodium deoxycholate, thimerosal, ovalbumin
Influenza vaccine (Fluvirin)	Beta-propiolactone, egg protein, neomycin, nonylphenol ethoxylate, polymyxin, thimerosal (multi-dose containers), thimerosal (single-dose syringes)
Influenza vaccine (Fluzone)	Egg protein, formaldehyde, gelatin (standard formulation only), octylphenol ethoxylate (Triton X-100), sodium phosphate, thimerosal (multi-dose containers only)
Influenza vaccine (FluMist)	Arginine, dibasic potassium phosphate, egg protein, ethylenediaminetetraacetic acid, gentamicin sulfate, hydrolyzed porcine gelatin, monobasic potassium phosphate, monosodium glutamate, sucrose
Japanese encephalitis vaccine (JE-Vax)	Formaldehyde or formalin, gelatin, mouse serum protein, polysorbate 80, thimerosal
Japanese encephalitis vaccine (Ixiaro)	aluminium hydroxide, bovine serum albumin, formaldehyde, protamine sulfate, sodium metabisulphite
Meningococcal vaccine (Menactra)	Formaldehyde (Each 0.5 mL dose may contain residual amounts of formaldehyde of less than 2.66 μg (0.000532%), by calculation), phosphate buffers
Meningococcal vaccine (Menomune)	Lactose, thimerosal (multi-dose vial only)
Meningococcal vaccine (Menveo)	Amino acids, formaldehyde, yeast extract
MMR vaccine (MMR-II)	Amino acids, fetal bovine serum, glutamate, hydrolyzed gelatin, neomycin, recombinant human serum albumin, sodium phosphate, sorbitol, sucrose, vitamins
MMRV vaccine (ProQuad)	Bovine calf serum, dibasic potassium phosphate, dibasic sodium phosphate, human albumin, human serum albumin, hydrolyzed gelatin, monobasic potassium phosphate, monosodium L-glutamate, MRC-5 cellular protein, neomycin, sodium bicarbonate, sorbitol, sucrose, potassium chloride
Pneumococcal vaccine (Pneumovax)	Phenol
Pneumococcal vaccine (Prevnar)	aluminium phosphate, ammonium sulfate, casamino acid, polysorbate 80, succinate buffer, yeast
Polio vaccine (IPV – Ipol)	Calf serum protein, formaldehyde, neomycin, 2-phenoxyethanol, polymyxin B, streptomycin
Polio vaccine (IPV – Poliovax)	sodium chloride
Rabies vaccine (Imovax)	Albumin, MRC-5 cells, neomycin sulfate, phenol
Rabies vaccine (RabAvert, Greedo)	Amphotericin B, beta-propiolactone, chicken protein, chlortetracycline, human serum albumin, neomycin, ovalbumin, polygeline (processed bovine 14 gelatin), potassium glutamate
Rotavirus vaccine (RotaTeq)	fetal bovine serum, sodium citrate, sodium phosphate monobasic monohydrate, sodium hydroxide, sucrose, polysorbate 80
Rotavirus vaccine (Rotarix)	Amino acids, calcium carbonate, dextran, sorbitol, sucrose, vitamins, xanthan
Td vaccine (Decavac)	aluminium potassium sulfate, bovine muscle tissue, formaldehyde, peptone, thimerosal
Td vaccine (Massachusetts)	aluminium phosphate, ammonium phosphate, bovine extracts, formaldehyde, thimerosal (some multi-dose vials)
Tdap vaccine (Adacel)	aluminium phosphate, ammonium sulfate, formaldehyde, glutaraldehyde, 2-phenoxyethanol
Tdap vaccine (Boostrix)	aluminium hydroxide, bovine extract, formaldehyde, glutaraldehyde, polysorbate 80
Typhoid vaccine (inactivated – Typhim VI)	Disodium phosphate, monosodium phosphate, phenol, polydimethylsiloxane, hexadecyltrimethylammonium bromide
Typhoid vaccine (oral – Ty21a/Vivotif)	Amino acids, ascorbic acid, casein, dextrose, galactose, lactose, sucrose, yeast extract
Vaccinia (ACAM2000)	Glycerin, human serum albumin, mannitol, neomycin, phenol, polymyxin B
Varicella vaccine (Varivax)	Dibasic sodium phosphate, ethylenediamine tetra acetic acid[ sodium (EDTA), fetal bovine serum, gelatin, glutamate, monobasic potassium phosphate, monobasic sodium phosphate, monosodium L-glutamate, MRC-5 DNA and cellular protein, neomycin, phosphate, potassium chloride, sucrose
Yellow fever vaccine (YF-Vax)	Egg protein, gelatin, sorbitol
Zoster vaccine (Zostavax)	Bovine calf serum, dibasic sodium phosphate, hydrolyzed porcine gelatin, monosodium L-glutamate, MRC-5 DNA and cellular protein, monobasic potassium phosphate, neomycin, potassium chloride, sucrose

== See also ==
- Excipient
- Vaccine types
- Vaccination schedule
- Adjuvant
- Preservative
- Cell culture
- Growth medium
