= Use of fetal tissue in vaccine development =

The use of fetal tissue in vaccine development is the practice of researching, developing, and producing vaccines through growing viruses in cultured (laboratory-grown) cells that were originally derived from human fetal tissue. Since the cell strains in use originate from abortions, there has been opposition to the practice and the resulting vaccines on religious and moral grounds.

The vaccines do not contain any of the original fetal tissue or cells or cells derived from fetal materials. Although the vaccine materials are purified from cell debris, traces of human DNA fragments remain. The cell lines continue to replicate on their own and no further sources of fetal cells are needed.

The Catholic Church has encouraged its members to use alternative vaccines, produced without human cell lines, if possible. However, the Vatican has clarified that "all vaccinations recognized as clinically safe and effective can be used in good conscience, with the certain knowledge that the use of such vaccines does not constitute formal cooperation with the abortion".

== Background ==
Immortalised cell lines are an important research tool offering a stable medium for experiments. These are derived either from tumors, which have developed resistance to cellular senescence, or from stem cells originally taken from aborted fetuses. Fetal cell lines have been used in the manufacture of vaccines since 1930s. One of the first medical applications of cell lines derived from fetal tissues was their use in the production of the first polio vaccines. For example, in the 1950s, scientists at the Karolinska Institute in Sweden propagated a polio virus in fetal cell lines to make into a polio vaccine. The resulting vaccine was given to about 2,000 children.

Many other vaccines, including those for chicken pox and rubella, are made using cell lines originally derived from fetal tissue from two pregnancies terminated in the 1960s, for reasons unrelated to vaccine development. Descendants of the fibroblast cells from these fetuses have been growing in labs ever since, as the WI-38 and MRC-5 cell lines. They are still used to grow vaccine viruses today. As of March 2017, billions of vaccines have been given that were made using the WI-38 line alone.

== Applications ==
Vaccines that have been or are made using cell lines originally derived from fetal tissue include:

- Adenovirus
- Chicken pox
- Ebola
- Polio
- Rabies
- Rubella
- Shingles

Of these, the vaccines approved for use in the United States include some of those against rabies (Imovax), rubella, chicken pox, shingles, and adenovirus (as of January 2017).

=== Rubella ===
One historical cell line used in rubella vaccines was originally obtained from a fetus aborted due to infection with rubella. Rubella during pregnancy can lead to miscarriage (spontaneous abortion), and if it does not, there is a risk of severe disability due to congenital rubella syndrome. By one estimate, rubella vaccination may prevent up to 5,000 miscarriages per year in the United States.

=== COVID-19 ===
Several of the vaccines in use or advanced development for COVID-19 use the cell lines HEK-293 or PER.C6 for production. In other cases, notably the vaccines made by Pfizer, Sputnik-V and Moderna, HEK-293 was used during the testing phase. PER.C6, a retinal cell line that was isolated from an aborted fetus in 1985 was used by Janssen in development of COVID-19 Vaccine.

== Alternatives ==
COS-1 cells are of monkey origin and there are xenogeneic differences between monkey and human proteins.

== Position of the Catholic Church ==
The Catholic Church is opposed to abortion. Nevertheless, the Pontifical Academy for Life, concluded in 2005 that parents may allow their children to receive vaccines made from fetal tissue if no alternative exists and there is a grave health risk. Consumers were urged to "oppose by all means (in writing, through the various associations, mass media, etc.) the vaccines which do not yet have morally acceptable alternatives, creating pressure so that alternative vaccines are prepared, which are not connected with the abortion of a human fetus". This academy also called for the development of new vaccines that can be made by other means. In 2017, the Pontifical Academy for Life stated that "clinically recommended vaccinations can be used with a clear conscience and that the use of such vaccines does not signify some sort of cooperation with voluntary abortion".

On December 21, 2020, the Vatican's doctrinal office, the Congregation for the Doctrine of the Faith, further clarified that it is "morally licit" for Catholics to receive vaccines derived from fetal cell lines or in which such lines were used in testing or development, including the COVID-19 vaccines, because "passive material cooperation in the procured abortion from which these cell lines originate is, on the part of those making use of the resulting vaccines, remote. The moral duty to avoid such passive material cooperation is not obligatory if there is a grave danger," such as during the COVID-19 pandemic, and that "in such a case, all vaccinations recognized as clinically safe and effective can be used in good conscience" and "does not and should not in any way imply that there is a moral endorsement of the use of cell lines proceeding from aborted fetuses". Moreover,

[F]rom the ethical point of view, the morality of vaccination depends not only on the duty to protect one's own health, but also on the duty to pursue the common good. In the absence of other means to stop or even prevent the epidemic, the common good may recommend vaccination, especially to protect the weakest and most exposed. Those who, however, for reasons of conscience, refuse vaccines produced with cell lines from aborted fetuses, must do their utmost to avoid, by other prophylactic means and appropriate behavior, becoming vehicles for the transmission of the infectious agent. In particular, they must avoid any risk to the health of those who cannot be vaccinated for medical or other reasons, and who are the most vulnerable.
