= Tandok =

Philippine traditional practice

Tandok is a traditional faith healing practice in the Philippines, purportedly used to prevent rabies and other diseases and poisoning following animal bites through the use of animal horns. The treatment has no proven scientific basis.

== Practice ==
Tandok has been described as a faith healing technique and as traditional medicine. The practice is claimed to be a treatment against various conditions like rabies, tetanus and venom poisoning.

Practitioners are called magtatandok. In tandok, small incisions are created on or near the wound of animal bite to induce better bleedings. Animal horns which can be sourced from a deer, carabao or goat are used as improvised suction apparatus. These are place over the incision with the practitioner using it to suck out the blood from the wound. This is said to remove the toxin or pathogen from the patient.

A stone is used to determine where the pathogen or toxin has supposedly spread. The number of horns used may vary depending the prognosis. The patient are advised to adjust their diet and avoid certain activities within days after undergoing the procedure.

== Risk ==
There is no proven scientific basis that tandok can treat or prevent rabies.

Many who undergo tandok for rabies prevention may report feeling better and falsely believe it is an effective treatment. In these case the concerned animal may have not been rabid in the first place. The risk is when the patient solely sought tandok and did not take modern prevention methods like rabies vaccination. Magtatandoks are therefore encouraged to advise their patrons to still go to animal bite centers for rabies treatment

== Legality ==
The practice of tandok in La Union is outlawed by virtue of Ordinance No. 053 of 2014, also known as Anti-tandok ordinance of 2014. Violators of the ordinance is penalized by either a year of imprisonment, a fine of ₱5,000, or both at the discretion of the court.
