= TMEM158 =

Protein-coding gene in the species Homo sapiens

Identifiers
- Aliases: TMEM158, BBP, RIS1, p40BBP, transmembrane protein 158 (gene/pseudogene), transmembrane protein 158
- External IDs: MGI: 1919559; HomoloGene: 9141; GeneCards: TMEM158; OMA:TMEM158 - orthologs

Gene location (Human)
Chr.	Chromosome 3 (human)
Band	3p21.31	Start	45,224,466 bp
Band	3p21.31	End	45,226,287 bp

Gene location (Mouse)
Chr.	Chromosome 9 (mouse)
Band	9|9 F4	Start	123,088,118 bp
Band	9|9 F4	End	123,089,829 bp
RNA expression pattern
Bgee	Human / Mouse (ortholog); Top expressed in: seminal vesicula; nucleus accumbens; putamen; caudate nucleus; ganglionic eminence; myometrium; periodontal fiber; tail of epididymis; entorhinal cortex; body of uterus / Top expressed in: dorsal striatum; olfactory tubercle; lateral septal nucleus; nucleus accumbens; ventromedial nucleus; anterior amygdaloid area; barrel cortex; globus pallidus; supraoptic nucleus; gastrula; More reference expression data
BioGPS	n/a
Orthologs
Species	Human	Mouse
Entrez	25907	72309
Ensembl	ENSG00000249992	ENSMUSG00000054871
UniProt	Q8WZ71	Q6F5E0
RefSeq (mRNA)	NM_015444	NM_001002267
RefSeq (protein)	NP_056259	NP_001002267
Location (UCSC)	Chr 3: 45.22 – 45.23 Mb	Chr 9: 123.09 – 123.09 Mb
PubMed search
- Wikidata
View/Edit Human	View/Edit Mouse

Transmembrane protein 158 is a protein that in humans is encoded by the TMEM158 gene.

Constitutive activation of the Ras pathway triggers an irreversible proliferation arrest reminiscent of replicative senescence. Transcription of this gene is upregulated in response to activation of the Ras pathway, but not under other conditions that induce senescence.

The encoded protein is similar to a rat cell surface receptor proposed to function in a neuronal survival pathway
