= DTP-HepB vaccine =

Combination vaccine

DTP-HepB
Combination of
- DTP vaccine: Vaccine
- Hepatitis B vaccine: Vaccine

Clinical data
- Trade names: Tritanrix-HepB
- AHFS/Drugs.com: UK Drug Information
- Routes of administration: Intramuscular injection
- ATC code: J07CA05 (WHO)

Identifiers
- CAS Number: 1012056-47-1

DTP-HepB vaccine is a combination vaccine whose generic name is diphtheria and tetanus toxoids and whole-cell pertussis and hepatitis B (recombinant) vaccine (adsorbed) or DTP-Hep B. It protects against the infectious diseases diphtheria, tetanus, pertussis, and hepatitis B.

A branded formulation, Tritanrix-HepB manufactured by GlaxoSmithKline, was granted marketing approval in the EU in 1996. Marketing approval lapsed in 2014.

A review conducted in 2012 concluded that there was insufficient evidence to determine differences in safety and efficacy between DTP-HepB vaccine and Hib vaccine administered separately and pentavalent DTP-HepB-Hib vaccine.
