= ATC code J07 =

ATC code J07 Vaccines is a therapeutic subgroup of the Anatomical Therapeutic Chemical Classification System, a system of alphanumeric codes developed by the World Health Organization (WHO) for the classification of drugs and other medical products. Subgroup J07 is part of the anatomical group J Antiinfectives for systemic use.

National versions of the ATC classification may include additional codes not present in this list, which follows the WHO version.

== J07A Bacterial vaccines ==
=== J07AC Anthrax vaccines ===
J07AC01 Anthrax antigen

=== J07AD Brucellosis vaccines ===
J07AD01 Brucella antigen

=== J07AE Cholera vaccines ===
J07AE01 Cholera, inactivated, whole cell
J07AE02 Cholera, live attenuated
J07AE51 Cholera, combinations with typhoid vaccine, inactivated, whole cell

=== J07AF Diphtheria vaccines ===
J07AF01 Diphtheria toxoid

=== J07AG Haemophilus influenzae B vaccines ===
J07AG01 Hemophilus influenzae B, purified antigen conjugated
J07AG51 Hemophilus influenzae B, combinations with toxoids
J07AG52 Hemophilus influenzae B, combinations with pertussis and toxoids
J07AG53 Hemophilus influenzae B, combinations with meningococcus C, conjugated
J07AG54 Haemophilus influenza B, combinations with meningococcus C, Y, conjugated

=== J07AH Meningococcal vaccines ===
J07AH01 Meningococcus A, purified polysaccharides antigen
J07AH02 Other meningococcal monovalent purified polysaccharides antigen
J07AH03 Meningococcus A, C, bivalent purified polysaccharides antigen
J07AH04 Meningococcus A, C, Y, W-135, tetravalent purified polysaccharides antigen
J07AH05 Other meningococcal polyvalent purified polysaccharides antigen
J07AH06 Meningococcus B, outer membrane vesicle vaccine
J07AH07 Meningococcus C, purified polysaccharides antigen conjugated
J07AH08 Meningococcus A, C, Y, W-135, tetravalent purified polysaccharides antigen conjugated
J07AH09 Meningococcus B, multicomponent vaccine
J07AH10 Meningococcus A, purified polysaccharides antigen conjugated
J07AH11 Meningococcus A,B,C,Y,W-135, pentavalent purified polysaccharides antigen conjugated and factor H binding protein

=== J07AJ Pertussis vaccines ===
J07AJ01 Pertussis, inactivated, whole cell
J07AJ02 Pertussis, purified antigen
J07AJ51 Pertussis, inactivated, whole cell, combinations with toxoids
J07AJ52 Pertussis, purified antigen, combinations with toxoids

=== J07AK Plague vaccines ===
J07AK01 Plague, inactivated, whole cell

=== J07AL Pneumococcal vaccines ===
J07AL01 Pneumococcus, purified polysaccharides antigen
J07AL02 Pneumococcus, purified polysaccharides antigen conjugated
J07AL52 Pneumococcus purified polysaccharides antigen and Haemophilus influenzae, conjugated

=== J07AM Tetanus vaccines ===
J07AM01 Tetanus toxoid
J07AM51 Tetanus toxoid, combinations with diphtheria toxoid
J07AM52 Tetanus toxoid, combinations with tetanus immunoglobulin

=== J07AN Tuberculosis vaccines ===
J07AN01 Tuberculosis, live attenuated

=== J07AP Typhoid vaccines ===
J07AP01 Typhoid, oral, live attenuated
J07AP02 Typhoid, inactivated, whole cell
J07AP03 Typhoid, purified polysaccharide antigen
J07AP10 Typhoid, combinations with paratyphi types

=== J07AR Typhus (exanthematicus) vaccines ===
J07AR01 Typhus exanthematicus, inactivated, whole cell

=== J07AX Other bacterial vaccines ===
J07AX01 Leptospira vaccines

== J07B Viral vaccines ==
=== J07BA Encephalitis vaccines ===
J07BA01 Encephalitis, tick-borne, inactivated, whole virus
J07BA02 Encephalitis, Japanese, inactivated, whole virus
J07BA03 Encephalitis, Japanese, live attenuated

=== J07BB Influenza vaccines ===
J07BB01 Influenza inactivated, whole virus
J07BB02 Influenza, purified antigen
J07BB03 Influenza, live attenuated
J07BB04 Influenza, virus like particles
J07BB05 Influenza, RNA-based vaccine
J07BB55 Influenza and covid-19, RNA-based vaccine

=== J07BC Hepatitis vaccines ===
J07BC01 Hepatitis B, purified antigen
J07BC02 Hepatitis A, inactivated, whole virus
J07BC20 Combinations

=== J07BD Measles vaccines ===
J07BD01 Measles, live attenuated
J07BD51 Measles, combinations with mumps, live attenuated
J07BD52 Measles, combinations with mumps and rubella, live attenuated
J07BD53 Measles, combinations with rubella, live attenuated
J07BD54 Measles, combinations with mumps, rubella and varicella, live attenuated

=== J07BE Mumps vaccines ===
J07BE01 Mumps, live attenuated

=== J07BF Poliomyelitis vaccines ===
J07BF01 Poliomyelitis oral, monovalent live attenuated
J07BF02 Poliomyelitis oral, trivalent, live attenuated
J07BF03 Poliomyelitis, trivalent, inactivated, whole virus
J07BF04 Poliomyelitis oral, bivalent, live attenuated

=== J07BG Rabies vaccines ===
J07BG01 Rabies, inactivated, whole virus

=== J07BH Rotavirus diarrhea vaccines ===
J07BH01 Rotavirus, live attenuated
J07BH02 Rotavirus, pentavalent, live, reassorted

=== J07BJ Rubella vaccines ===
J07BJ01 Rubella, live attenuated
J07BJ51 Rubella, combinations with mumps, live attenuated

=== J07BK Varicella zoster vaccines ===
J07BK01 Varicella, live attenuated
J07BK02 Zoster, live attenuated
J07BK03 Zoster, purified antigen

=== J07BL Yellow fever vaccines ===
J07BL01 Yellow fever, live attenuated

=== J07BM Papillomavirus vaccines ===
J07BM01 Papillomavirus (human types 6, 11, 16, 18)
J07BM02 Papillomavirus (human types 16, 18)
J07BM03 Papillomavirus (human types 6, 11, 16, 18, 31, 33, 45, 52, 58)

=== J07BN Covid-19 vaccines ===
J07BN01 Covid-19, RNA-based vaccine
J07BN02 Covid-19, viral vector, non-replicating
J07BN03 Covid-19, inactivated virus
J07BN04 Covid-19, protein subunit
J07BN05 Covid-19, virus-like particles

=== J07BP Chikungunya vaccines ===
J07BP01 Chikungunya, live attenuated
J07BP02 Chikungunya, virus-like particles

=== J07BX Other viral vaccines ===
J07BX01 smallpox and mpox vaccines
J07BX02 Ebola vaccines
J07BX04 Dengue virus vaccines
J07BX05 Respiratory syncytial virus vaccines
J07BX06 Enterovirus 71 vaccines

== J07C Bacterial and viral vaccines ==
=== J07CA Bacterial and viral vaccines, combined ===
J07CA01 Diphtheria-poliomyelitis-tetanus
J07CA02 Diphtheria-pertussis-poliomyelitis-tetanus
J07CA03 Diphtheria-rubella-tetanus
J07CA04 Hemophilus influenzae B and poliomyelitis
J07CA05 Diphtheria-hepatitis B-pertussis-tetanus
J07CA06 Diphtheria-hemophilus influenzae B-pertussis-poliomyelitis-tetanus
J07CA07 Diphtheria-hepatitis B-tetanus
J07CA08 Hemophilus influenzae B and hepatitis B
J07CA09 Diphtheria-hemophilus influenzae B-pertussis-poliomyelitis-tetanus-hepatitis B
J07CA10 Typhoid-hepatitis A
J07CA11 Diphtheria-Hemophilus influenzae B-pertussis-tetanus-hepatitis B
J07CA12 Diphtheria-pertussis-poliomyelitis-tetanus-hepatitis B
J07CA13 Diphtheria-hemophilus influenzae B-pertussis-tetanus-hepatitis B-meningococcus A + C

== J07X Other vaccines ==
=== J07XA Parasitic vaccines ===
J07XA01 Malaria vaccines

== See also ==
- Vaccines for veterinary use are in the ATCvet group QI.
