= Haemophilus B and hepatitis B vaccine =

Combination of
- Hib vaccine: Vaccine
- Hepatitis B vaccine: Vaccine

Clinical data
- Trade names: Comvax
- AHFS/Drugs.com: Micromedex Detailed Consumer Information
- Routes of administration: Intramuscular
- ATC code: J07CA08 (WHO)

Identifiers
- CAS Number: 820977-94-4
- ChemSpider: none

Haemophilus B and hepatitis B vaccine is a combination vaccine whose generic name is Haemophilus b conjugate and hepatitis B recombinant vaccine. It protects against the infectious diseases Haemophilus influenzae type B and hepatitis B.

A branded formulation, Comvax, was marketed in the US by Merck. It was discontinued in 2014.
