= Rabies vaccine =

Vaccines to prevent rabies in humans and animals

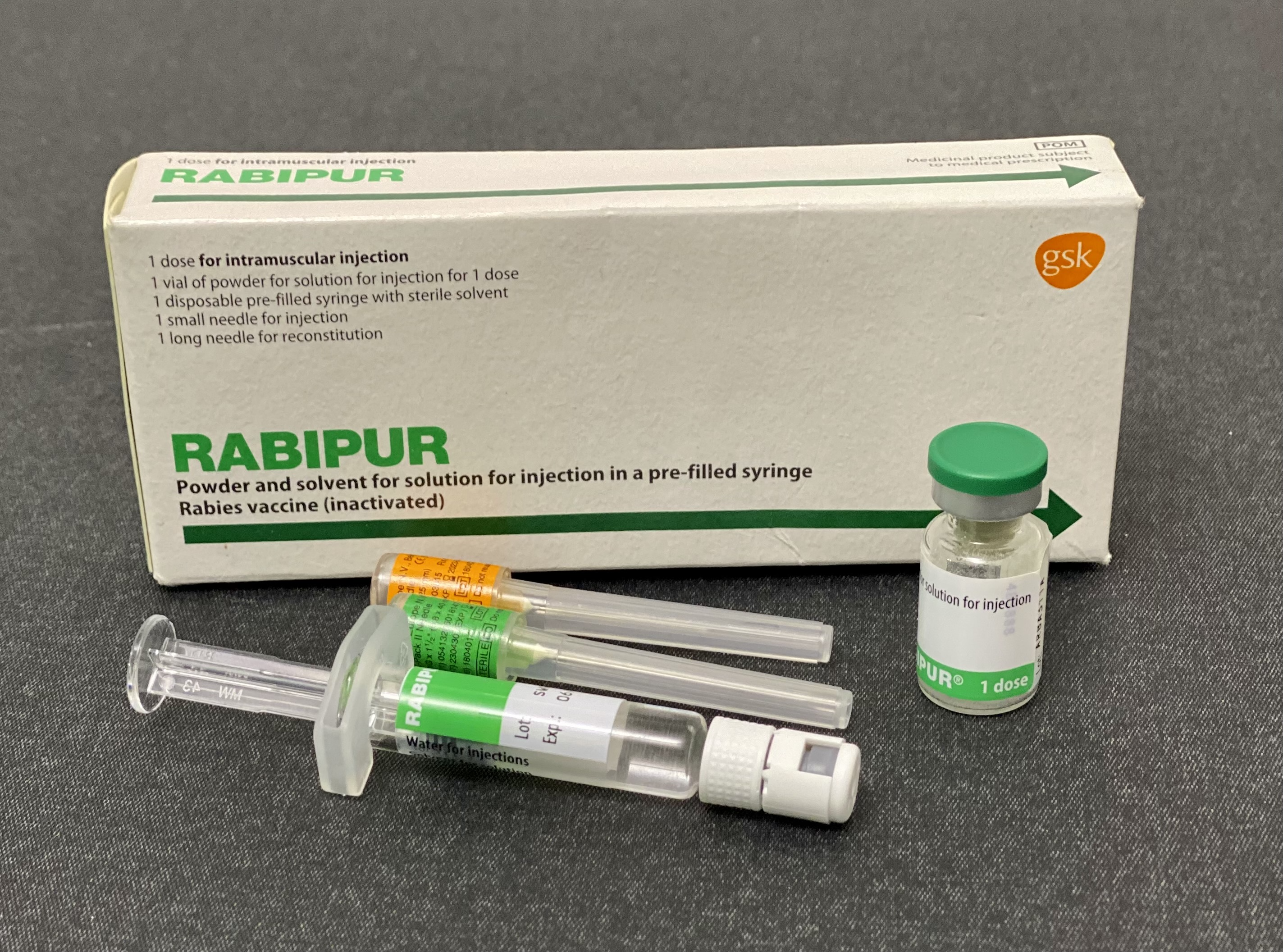

Vaccine description
- Target: Rabies
- Vaccine type: Inactivated

Clinical data
- Trade names: Rabavert, others
- AHFS/Drugs.com: Monograph
- MedlinePlus: a607023
- License data: US DailyMed: Rabavert
- Pregnancy category: AU: B2
- Routes of administration: Intramuscular, intradermal
- ATC code: J07BG01 (WHO) J06AA06 (WHO)

Legal status
- Legal status: AU: S4 (Prescription only); UK: POM (Prescription only); US: ℞-only; EU: Rx-only; In general: ℞ (Prescription only)

Identifiers
- DrugBank: DB10283; DB10062
- ChemSpider: none
- UNII: FK894Q51YE; C4HQF74XMW
- KEGG: D06504

A rabies vaccine is a vaccine used to prevent rabies. There are several rabies vaccines available that are both safe and effective. Vaccinations must be administered prior to rabies virus exposure or within the latent period after exposure to prevent the disease. Transmission of rabies virus to humans typically occurs through a bite or scratch from an infectious animal, but exposure can occur through indirect contact with the saliva from an infectious individual.

Doses are usually given by injection into the skin or muscle. After exposure, the vaccination is typically used along with rabies immunoglobulin. It is recommended that those who are at high risk of exposure be vaccinated before potential exposure. Rabies vaccines are effective in humans and other animals, and vaccinating dogs is very effective in preventing the spread of rabies to humans. A long-lasting immunity to the virus develops after a full course of treatment.

Rabies vaccines may be used safely by all age groups. About 35 to 45 percent of people develop a brief period of redness and pain at the injection site, and 5 to 15 percent of people may experience fever, headaches, or nausea. After exposure to rabies, there is no contraindication to its use, because the untreated virus is virtually 100% fatal.

The first rabies vaccine was introduced in 1885 and was followed by an improved version in 1908. Over 29 million people worldwide receive human rabies vaccine annually. It is on the World Health Organization's List of Essential Medicines.

== Medical uses ==
=== Before exposure ===
The World Health Organization (WHO) recommends vaccinating those who are at high risk of the disease, such as children who live in areas where it is common. Other groups may include veterinarians, researchers, or people planning to travel to regions where rabies is common. Three doses of the vaccine are given over a one-month period on days zero, seven, and either twenty-one or twenty-eight.

=== After exposure ===
Before the administering of the vaccines and RIG, it is necessary to first clean the wound. This should be done by washing for at least 15 minutes with water and soap, and using a virucidal agent such as povidone-iodine to irrigate the wound.

For individuals who have been potentially exposed to the virus, four doses over two weeks are recommended, as well as an injection of rabies immunoglobulin with the first dose. This is known as post-exposure vaccination. For people who have previously been vaccinated, only two doses of the rabies vaccine are required. However, vaccination after exposure is neither a treatment nor a cure for rabies; it can only prevent the development of rabies in a person if given before the virus reaches the brain. Because the rabies virus has a relatively long incubation period, post-exposure vaccinations are typically highly effective.

=== Additional doses ===
Immunity following a course of doses is typically long lasting, and additional doses are usually not needed unless the person has a high risk of contracting the virus. Those at risk may have tests done to measure the amount of rabies antibodies in the blood, and then get rabies boosters as needed. Following administration of a booster dose, one 2002 study found 97% of immunocompetent individuals demonstrated protective levels of neutralizing antibodies after ten years. A 2021 study found that in patients who had received PrEP rabies vaccines in the form of 2 doses or 3-doses 10-24 years ago, rabies immunological memory was reactivated in all patients within 7 days after a single intramuscular booster immunization.

The WHO recommends that patients who had received at least 2 doses of PrEP in the past be given after exposure either of the following three approved protocols of rabies vaccine booster administration: 1-site ID on days 0 and 3; or 4-sites ID on day 0; or 1-site IM on days 0 and 3. RIG should not be given to patients who had undergone PrEP.

=== Immunization plan ===
People potentially exposed to rabies should discuss with a medical professional about risk assessment, namely the risk that the animal might be rabid, and about options for treatment, including about possible drug interactions, such as immunosuppressive medications. RIG (which provides immediate temporary passive immunity) should be given on the same day with the first rabies vaccine injection, or, if this is not possible, within a week after the first rabies vaccine.However, RIG should never be administered in the same syringe or in the same anatomical site as the first vaccine dose. RIG should not be given if more than a week has elapsed from the first dose of vaccine, after the second dose of vaccine or to people who are already partially immunized (such as people who had received PrEP) because this can interfere with their already existing antibodies.

If a dog, cat or ferret is still alive and healthy (as certified by a professional) after 10 days from the exposure, then it could not have been infectious at the time of the exposure. However, in countries where rabies is common, the possibility of keeping the animal under observation should not lead to delay in the beginning of the treatment, because human rabies symptoms can occur as early as 7 days, and once symptoms have started the treatment is no longer effective. Instead, post-exposure prophylaxis should be started immediately after exposure, and it can subsequently be discontinued after 10 days, with the existing treatment functioning as PrEP for future exposure.

== Safety ==
Rabies vaccines are safe in all age groups. About 35 to 45 percent of people develop a brief period of redness and pain at the injection site, and 5 to 15 percent of people may experience fever, headaches, or nausea. Because of the certain fatality of the virus, receiving the vaccine is always advisable.

Vaccines made from nerve tissue are used in a few countries, mainly in Asia and Latin America, but are less effective and have greater side effects. Their use is thus not recommended by the World Health Organization.

== Types ==
All human rabies vaccines are inactivated vaccines made by inactivation of virus-containing material. The oldest kind are nerve tissue vaccines, made from the nerve tissue of rabies-infected animals. They are still approved in a few countries. They are not recommended by the WHO as they are less effective and have greater side effects. They also contain impurities of nervous origin such as myelin.

Instead, WHO recommends Cell Culture Vaccines and Embryonated egg-based vaccines (CCEEV), where the virus is grown in cultured cells or fertilized duck eggs before being inactivated. The virus is then separated out and used for making the vaccine by ultrafiltration or ultracentrifugation. The process renders CCEEVs purer and more concentrated, which contributes to its safety and effectiveness. As with the older type, CCEEVs can be used in both pre- and post-exposure vaccinations. Specific CCEEVs are classified by the type of cell the virus is grown in and include:

Human diploid cell rabies vaccines (HDCV)
Approved HDCVs are grown in the MRC-5 cell line and contains the Pitman-Moore L503 or Flury strain. They are purified by ultrafiltration.
HDCVs were first experimentally made by using the WI-38 cell line in 1961. This was a gift to Hilary Koprowski at the Wistar Institute by Leonard Hayflick, an Associate Member, who developed this normal human diploid cell strain.
Purified chick embryo cell vaccinee (PCECV)
Produced by growing fixed rabies virus strain Flury LEP-25 in primary cultures of chick fibroblasts. Ultracentrifuged.
Purified Vero cell rabies vaccine (PVRV)
Produced by growing the Wister strain in vero cells, which means the vaccine can be made by growing in a bioreactor vat, making it easier to mass produce. Ultracentrifuged.
Brand names include Verorab (Sanofi-Aventis) and Speeda (Liaoning Chengda). Verorab is approved in the Australia European Union. It is also prequalified by the WHO, which means that it is considered appropriate to be used by UN organizations.
Primary Hamster Kidney Cell vaccine (PHKCV)
Contains the Beijing strain grown in baby hamster kidney cells. Ultracentrifuged.
Purified duck embryo vaccine (PDEV)
Grown in fertilized duck eggs and ultracentrifuged.

== Storage ==
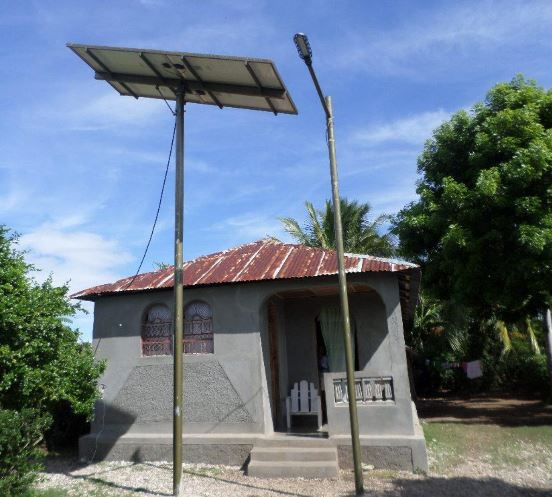
Clinic in Haiti where solar power is used to refrigerate rabies vaccine

As of 2018, all human CCEEVs available are packaged as single-dose vials containing the lyophilized vaccine. They are reconstituted by adding water prior to injection. This kind of vaccines are intended to be stored at a temperature between 2°C and 8°C (36°F to 46°F): refrigerated, not frozen.

=== Research on storage ===
The need for refrigeration is a barrier to vaccination in less-developed areas, as a power outage could make an entire community's supply of vaccines a write-off. In 2025, a team from University of Colorado Boulder reported that their experimental sapphire-coated CCEEV maintained its potency for three months at 104 °F (40 °C).

Currently approved CCEEVs are also more thermotolerant than the label suggests: a commercial CCEEV packaged as a ready-to-inject solution in a vial, with a 2–8 °C recommendation from the manufacturer, was found to have lost none of its effectiveness in dogs after spending three months at 30 °C (86 °F). It is believed that liquid vaccines degrade by processes such as aggregation of protein particles, so dry human vaccines are expected to be even more stable. Indeed, a human CCEEV was found to remain effective after three months at 37 °C (99 °F).

== History ==
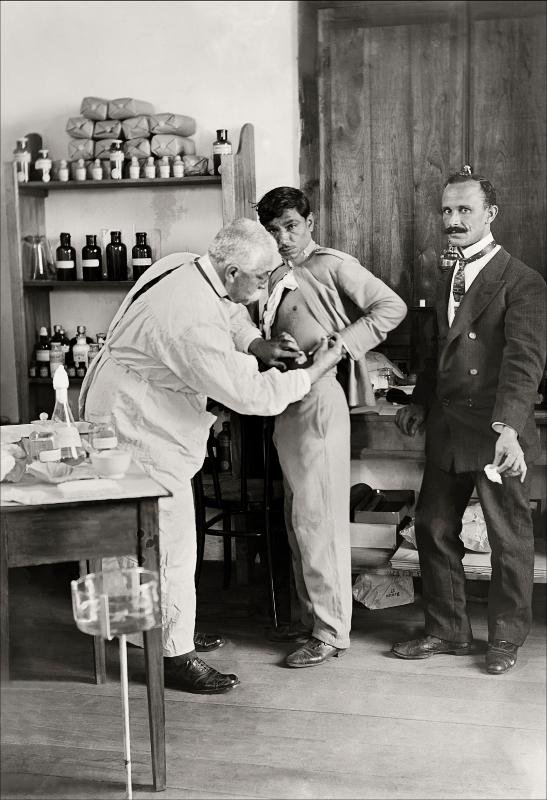
Early-20th-century rabies vaccination in Santa Catarina, Brazil

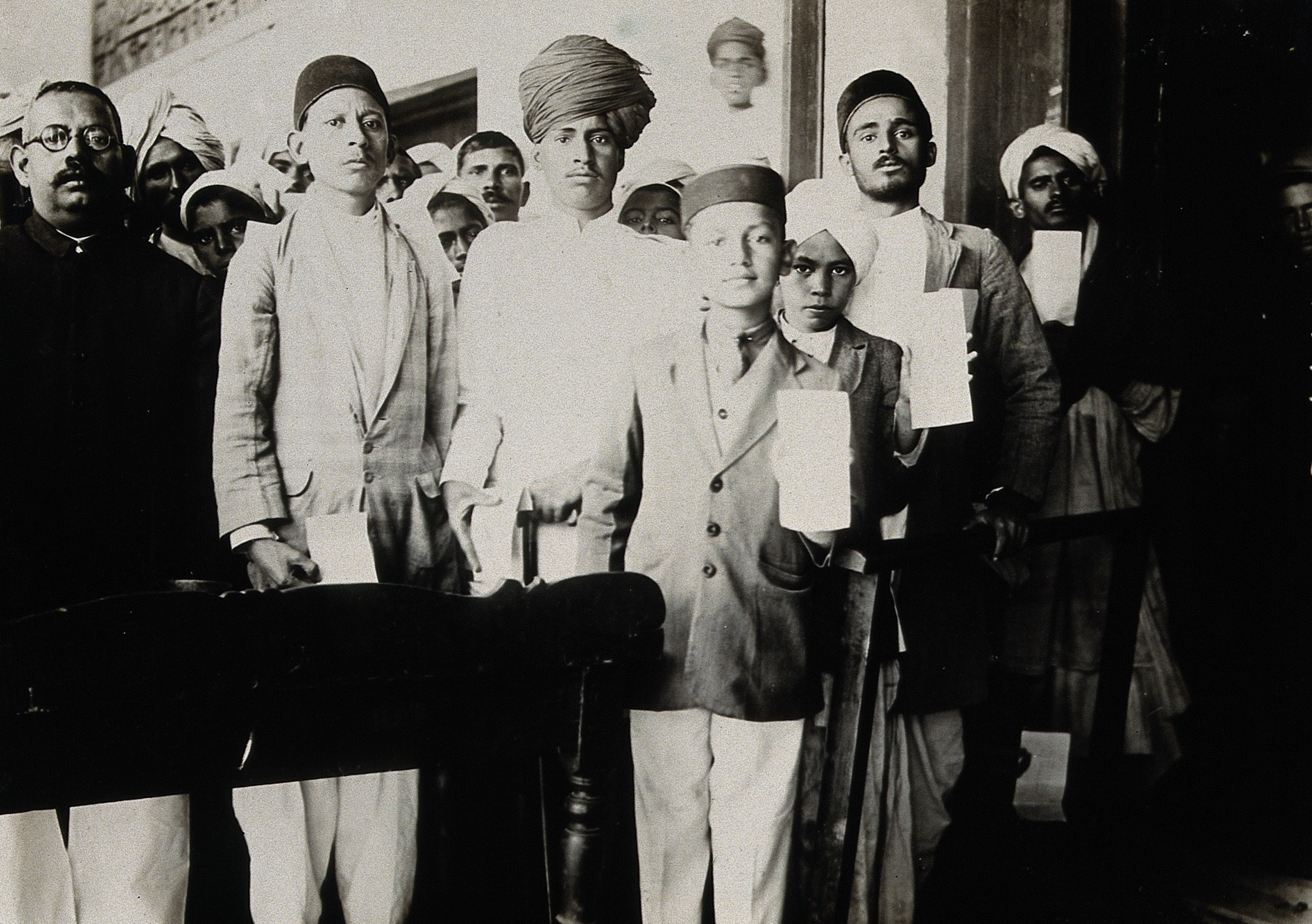
The Pasteur Institute Hospital, Kasauli, India. Indian patients holding treatment cards awaiting inoculation against rabies, ca. 1910

Virtually all infections with rabies resulted in death until two French scientists, Louis Pasteur and Émile Roux, developed the first rabies vaccination in 1885. Nine-year-old Joseph Meister (1876–1940), who had been mauled by a rabid dog, was the first human to receive this vaccine. The treatment started with a subcutaneous injection on 6 July 1885, at 8:00 pm, which was followed with 12 additional doses administered over the following 10 days. The first injection was derived from the spinal cord of an inoculated rabbit which had died of rabies 15 days earlier. All the doses were obtained by attenuation, but later ones were progressively more virulent.

After the rabies vaccine created by Louis Pasteur was first introduced in France in 1885, its use soon spread to other countries, including outside of Europe. The vaccine was first used in the United States in 1886. In 1888, France established the Pasteur Institute. During the following decades, several similar specialized rabies prevention centers ("Pasteur Institutes") appeared around the world. By 1909 there were 75 such rabies centers worldwide, including in French Indochina. Victims of animal bites in Siam were already receiving the rabies vaccine as early as 1891, becoming the first patients to receive it in Asia. By the late 19th century, European jurisdictions were regulating rabies treatment by opening their own rabies centers or by directing patients to the nearest centers abroad. For example, in 1890, Serbia introduced a royal government directive which ordered patients to be treated at the Pasteur Institute in Budapest. Despite the increased availability of vaccines, in practice they were often restricted to the wealthy upper classes, since access commonly required complicated procedures, such as traveling long distances to access treatment and arranging for an extended stay to receive the treatment which involved several weeks of injections, which many people could not afford.

The Pasteur-Roux vaccine attenuated the harvested virus samples by allowing them to dry for five to ten days. Similar nerve tissue-derived vaccines are still used in some countries, and while they are much cheaper than modern cell culture vaccines, they are not as effective. Neural tissue vaccines also carry a certain risk of neurological complications. Since the 1980s, countries have increasingly abandoned the use of nerve tissue-derived vaccines, replacing them with modern vaccines. The use of nerve tissue-derived vaccines was phased out in China in 1990, Thailand in 1992, Sri Lanka in 1995, Indonesia in 1996, Philippines in 1997, Laos in 2005, Cambodia in 2005, India in 2005, Nepal in 2006, Vietnam in 2007 and Bangladesh in 2011.

== Society and culture ==
=== Economics ===
When the modern cell-culture rabies vaccine was first introduced in the early 1980s, it cost $45 per dose, and was considered to be too expensive. The cost of the rabies vaccine continues to be a limitation to acquiring pre-exposure rabies immunization for travelers from developed countries. In 2015, in the United States, a course of three doses could cost over US$1,000, while in Europe a course costs around €100. It is possible and more cost-effective to split one intramuscular dose of the vaccine into several intradermal doses. This method is recommended by the World Health Organization (WHO) in areas that are constrained by cost or with supply issues. The route is as safe and effective as intramuscular according to the WHO.

=== In film ===
Several movies deal with rabies vaccine, notably the 1936 The Story of Louis Pasteur, which focuses on the life and achievements of Louis Pasteur, played by Paul Muni. The 1966 film Rage features a man bitten by a rabid dog who engages in a race against time to reach the nearest medical establishment to get the vaccine.

== Veterinary use ==
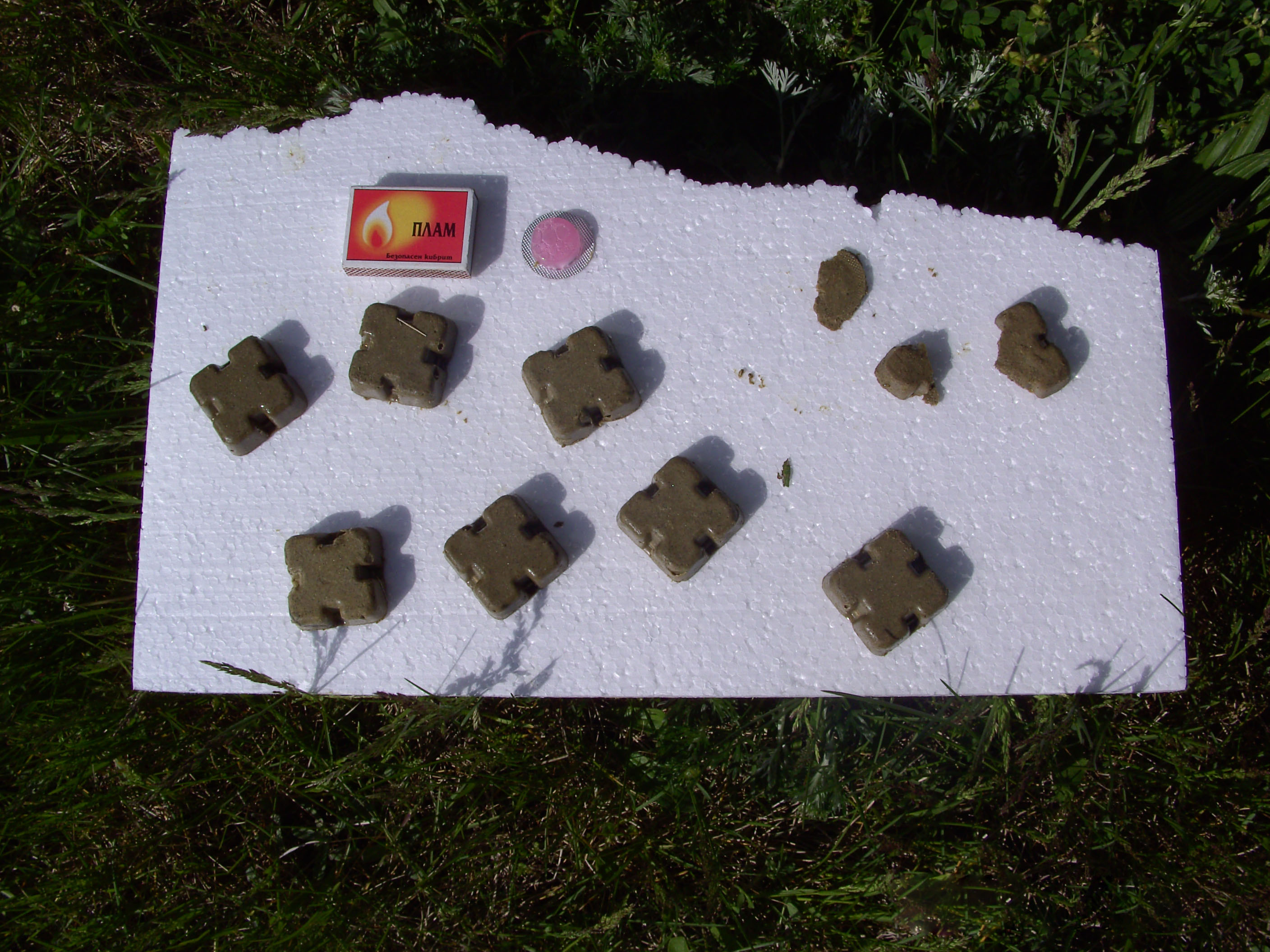
LYSVULPEN attenuated baits with vaccine for oral vaccination

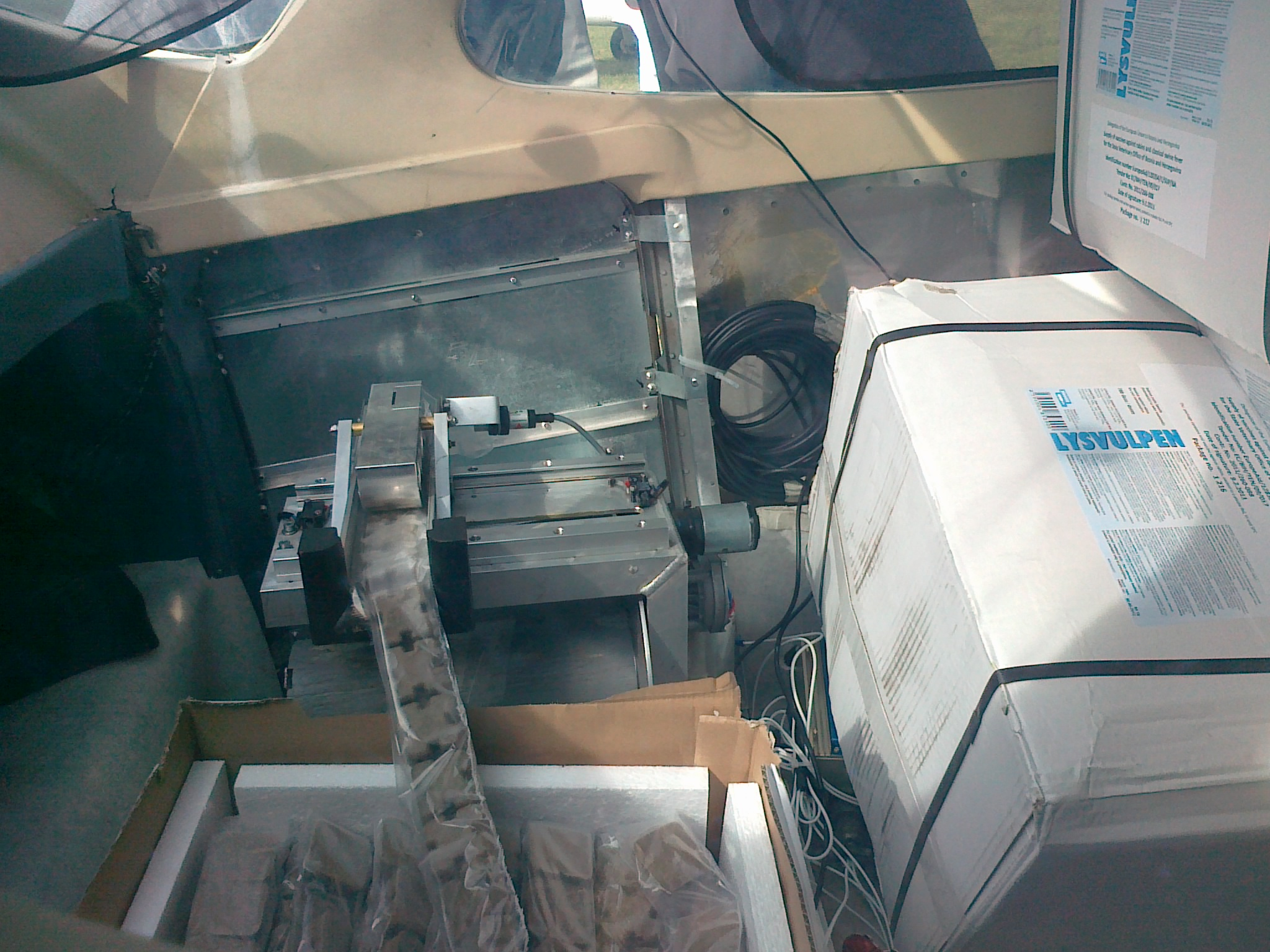
Machine for distribution of baits from airplane

Animals, not humans, serve as reservoir species for rabies and are responsible for passing the virus to humans in the overwhelming majority of cases. Therefore to eliminate rabies in an area is to eliminate rabies from the local animal populations, both wild and domestic. Pre-exposure immunization has been used on domesticated and wild populations. In many jurisdictions, domestic dogs, cats, ferrets, and rabbits are required to be vaccinated.

=== Types ===
There are several main types of vaccines used for non-human animals:

Inactivated rabies virus (by injection)
Modern injected vaccines are CCEEVs technologically similar to what is used in humans. They are packaged as single-dose vials; the contents of the vials may either be a lyophilized powder (like in human CCEEVs) or a ready-for-injection liquid. Imrab is an example containing the Pasteur strain of killed rabies virus. Several different types of Imrab exist, including Imrab, Imrab 3, and Imrab Large Animal. Imrab 3 has been approved for ferrets and, in some areas, pet skunks.
Modified live viruses (by mouth)
Live rabies virus from attenuated strains. Attenuated means strains that have developed mutations that cause them to be weaker and do not cause disease.
Recombinant live viral vector vaccine (by mouth)
In this kind of vaccine, a suitably weak non-rabies virus is genetically modified to produce the antigenic "shell" of the rabies virus such as the rabies glycoprotein. As a result, the virions it makes after entering a cell would also have the shell of the rabies virus, allowing the immune system to learn about the antigen. It does not cause rabies because it does not have any other gene from rabies, but it may still be transmissible among animals depending on the design (replication-competence).

Only the first two types are approved for pets and are eligible for a vaccination certificate. The last is generally only available to government agencies for use on wildlife.

=== Pets ===
In 1979, the Van Houweling Research Laboratory of the Silliman University Medical Center in Dumaguete in the Philippines developed and produced a dog vaccine that gave a three-year immunity from rabies. The development of the vaccine resulted in the elimination of rabies in many parts of the Visayas and Mindanao Islands. The successful program in the Philippines was later used as a model by other countries, such as Ecuador and the Mexican state of Yucatán, in their fight against rabies conducted in collaboration with the World Health Organization.

In Tunisia, a rabies control program was initiated to give dog owners free of charge vaccination to promote mass vaccination which was sponsored by their government. The vaccine is known as Rabisin (Mérial), which is a cell based rabies vaccine only used countrywide. Vaccinations are often administered when owners take in their dogs for check-ups and visits at the vet.

Oral rabies vaccines (see below for details) have been trialled on feral/stray dogs in some areas with high rabies incidence, as it could potentially be more efficient than catching and injecting them. However these have not been deployed for dogs at large scale yet.

=== Wild animals ===
Wildlife species, primarily bats, raccoons, skunks, and foxes, act as reservoir species for different variants of the rabies virus in distinct geographic regions of the United States. This results in the general occurrence of rabies as well as outbreaks in animal populations. Approximately 90% of all reported rabies cases in the US are from wildlife.

Injections are too laborious for reaching enough animals to reach herd immunity, so oral rabies vaccines (ORVs) are used instead. ORVs are incorporated into food baits and scattered across the landscape for them to be eaten. When an animal bites into the bait, the packets burst and the vaccine is administered. Current research suggests that if adequate amounts of the vaccine is ingested, immunity to the virus should last for upwards of one year. By immunizing wild or stray animals, ORV programs work to create a buffer zone between the rabies virus and potential contact with humans, pets, or livestock. Landscape features such as large bodies of water and mountains are often used to enhance the effectiveness of the buffer. The effectiveness of ORV campaigns in specific areas is determined through trap-and-release methods. Titer tests are performed on the blood drawn from the sample animals in order to measure rabies antibody levels in the blood. Baits are usually distributed by aircraft to more efficiently cover large, rural regions. In order to place baits more precisely and to minimize human and pet contact with baits, they are distributed by hand in suburban or urban regions. The standard bait distribution density is 75 baits/km^{2} in rural areas and 150 baits/km^{2} in urban and developed areas.

ORV programs were initiated in Europe in the 1980s, Canada in 1985, and in the United States in 1990. ORV is a preventive measure to eliminate rabies in wild animal vectors of disease, mainly foxes, raccoons, raccoon dogs, coyotes and jackals, but also can be used for dogs in developing countries. Implementation of ORV programs in the United States has led to the elimination of the coyote rabies virus variant in 2003 and gray fox variant during 2013. Furthermore, ORV has been successful in preventing the westward expansion of the raccoon rabies enzootic front beyond Alabama.

==== Attenuated ====
The idea of wildlife vaccination was conceived during the 1960s, and modified-live rabies viruses were used for the experimental oral vaccination of carnivores by the 1970s. Development of an oral immunization for wildlife began in the United States with laboratory trials using the live, attenuated Evelyn-Rokitnicki-Abelseth (ERA) vaccine, derived from the Street Alabama Dufferin (SAD) strain. The first ORV field trial using the live attenuated vaccine to immunize foxes occurred in Switzerland during 1978. Modified live virus vaccines may use strains such as SAG2 and SAD B19..

==== V-RG ====
RABORAL V-RG (Boehringer Ingelheim, Duluth, GA, USA) is a vaccinia virus (originally a smallpox vaccine) modified to express rabies glycoprotein. V-RG has been proven safe in over 60 animal species including cats and dogs. It is only approved for wildlife and sold to federal agencies. V-RG has been the only ORV licensed in the US for rabies virus management since 1997. V-RG baits consist of a small packet containing the oral vaccine which is then either coated in a fishmeal paste or encased in a fishmeal-polymer block.

==== ONRAB ====
ONRAB "Ultralite" (Artemis Technologies Inc., Guelph, Ontario, Canada) is an experimental adenovirus vaccine. ONRAB baits have been distributed by the United States Department of Agriculture (USDA) in select areas of the eastern United States under an experimental permit to target raccoons since 2011. ONRAB "Ultralite" baits consist of a blister pack with a coating matrix of vanilla flavor, green food coloring, vegetable oil and hydrogenated vegetable fat.
