= WI-38 =

Human cell line composed of fibroblasts

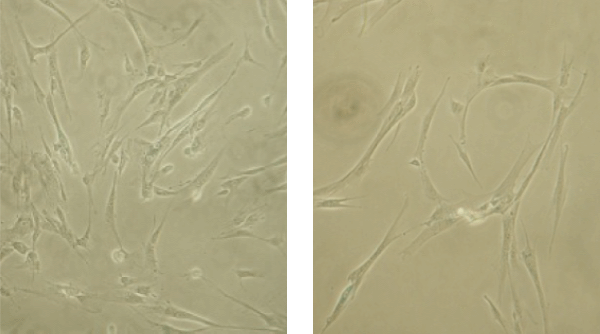
WI-38 cells (Left: in high density. Right: in low density)

WI-38 is a diploid human cell line composed of fibroblasts derived from lung tissue of a 3-month-gestation female fetus. The fetus came from a legal abortion performed in Sweden in 1962. The cell line was isolated by Leonard Hayflick the same year, and has been used extensively in scientific research, with applications ranging from developing important theories in molecular biology and aging to the production of most human virus vaccines. The uses of this cell line in human virus vaccine production is estimated to have saved the lives of millions of people.

== History ==
The WI-38 cell line stemmed from earlier work by Hayflick growing human cell cultures.

In the early 1960s, Hayflick and his colleague Paul Moorhead at the Wistar Institute in Philadelphia, Pennsylvania discovered that when normal human cells were stored in a freezer, the cells remembered the doubling level at which they were stored and, when reconstituted, began to divide from that level to roughly 50 total doublings (for cells derived from fetal tissue). Hayflick determined that normal cells gradually experience signs of senescence as they divide, first slowing before stopping division altogether. This finding is the basis for the Hayflick limit, which specifies the number of times a normal human cell population will divide before cell division stops. Hayflick's discovery later contributed to the determination of the biological roles of telomeres. Hayflick claimed that the finite capacity of normal human cells to replicate was an expression of aging or senescence at the cellular level.

During this period of research, Hayflick also discovered that if cells were properly stored in a freezer, cells would remain viable and that an enormous number of cells could be produced from a single starting culture. One of the cell strains that Hayflick isolated, which he named WI-38, was found to be free of contaminating viruses, unlike the primary monkey kidney cells then in use for virus vaccine production. In addition, WI-38 cells could be frozen, then thawed and exhaustively tested. These advantages led to WI-38 quickly replacing primary monkey kidney cells for human virus vaccine production. WI-38 has also been used for research on numerous aspects of normal human cell biology.

== Applications ==
WI-38 was invaluable to early researchers, especially those studying virology and immunology, since it was a readily available cell line of normal human tissue. Unlike the HeLa cell line, which were cancerous cells, WI-38 was a normal human cell population. Researchers in labs across the globe have since used WI-38 in their discoveries, most notably Hayflick in his development of human virus vaccines. Infected WI-38 cells secrete the virus, and can be cultured in large volumes suitable for commercial production.

Virus vaccines produced in WI-38 have prevented disease or saved the lives of billions of people. Vaccines produced in WI-38 include those made against adenoviruses, rubella, measles, mumps, varicella zoster, poliovirus, hepatitis A and rabies.

== Genome sequence ==
The WI-38 cell line was one of the first cell lines whose diploid genome was sequenced. This is critical because most human genome sequences have not been resolved to chromosome level, that is, it remained largely unclear which genetic variant is on which of the two chromatids. Besides being an important cell line for experimental studies (e.g. on aging), the WI-38 line is believed to have remained diploid since it was originally established in 1961. Nearly 60 years later, karyotyping by Soifer et al. (2020) showed that the WI-38 genome has not acquired major rearrangements such as translocations. More importantly, the de novo phased assembly confirms that the genome has in fact remained diploid and retained its heterozygosity throughout. It is therefore a good model for genome sequencing and serves as another reference genome.

== See also ==
- Use of fetal tissue in vaccine development
- MRC-5
