= Hepatitis A and B vaccine =

Vaccine against hepatitis virus A and B

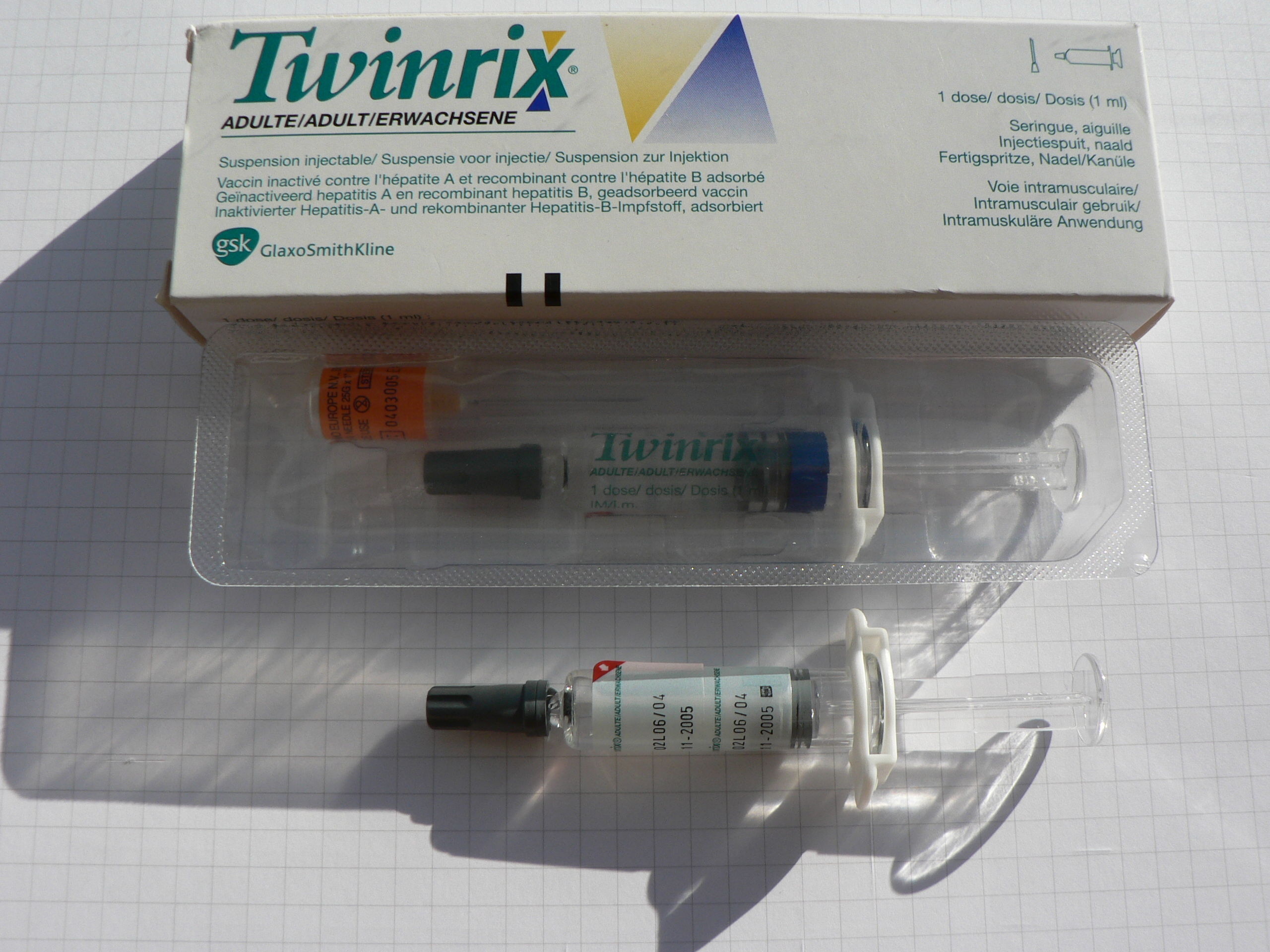
- Combined hepatitis A and B vaccine (Twinrix)

Combination of
- Hepatitis A vaccine: Vaccine
- Hepatitis B vaccine: Vaccine

Clinical data
- Trade names: Twinrix, Ambirix, others
- AHFS/Drugs.com: FDA Professional Drug Information
- License data: US DailyMed: Hepatitis A and hepatitis A
- Pregnancy category: AU: B2
- Routes of administration: Intramuscular
- ATC code: J07BC20 (WHO)

Legal status
- Legal status: AU: S4 (Prescription only); UK: POM (Prescription only); US: ℞-only; EU: Rx-only

Identifiers
- CAS Number: 467420-42-4
- ChemSpider: none
- UNII: 5BFC8LZ6LQ

Combined hepatitis A and B vaccine, is used to provide protection against hepatitis A and hepatitis B. It is given by injection into muscle.

It is used in areas where hepatitis A and B are endemic, for travelers, people with hepatitis C or chronic liver disease, and those at high risk of sexually transmitted diseases.

The combined vaccine is as safe and protective as if given as separate hepatitis A and B vaccines. It is generally well-tolerated. Common side effects are mild and include redness and pain at the injection site, where a small lump may appear. Feeling faint or tired, or a headache may occur. Other side effects include numbness, tingling, rash, bruising, abnormal bleeding such as from the nose or gums, weak muscle or pain. Severe side effects are rare and include an allergic reaction and seizures.

It is widely available.

== Administration schedule ==
Routine Twinrix vaccination is administered by intramuscular injection in the deltoid area using a schedule of three separate doses at 0, 1, and 6 months ([minimum intervals: 4 weeks between doses 1 and 2, 5 months between doses 2 and 3]). In some circumstances, an accelerated dosing schedule of 0, 7 and 21 to 30 days followed by a booster at 12 months can be used and was shown to have similar efficacy as the traditional schedule.

== Efficacy ==
The U.S. Centers for Disease Control and Prevention (CDC) reports that clinical trials found the following levels of protection against Hepatitis A and Hepatitis B one month after each dose:

A: 93.8%, 98.8%, 99.9%
B: 30.8%, 78.2%, 98.5%

== Availability ==
Twinrix is a brand manufactured by GlaxoSmithKline Biologicals. The full generic name is hepatitis A inactivated & hepatitis B (recombinant) vaccine. Twinrix is administered over three doses. The name was created because it is a mixture of two earlier vaccines — Havrix, an inactivated-virus Hepatitis A vaccine, and Engerix-B, a recombinant Hepatitis B vaccine. Twinrix first entered the market in early 1997.

In the United States, Twinrix is approved by the Food and Drug Administration (FDA) for those aged 18 and older. In some countries outside the United States, notably Canada and in the European Union, Twinrix is known as Twinrix Adult or Ambirix and a pediatric formulation, called Twinrix Junior or Twinrix Paediatric, is available.

== Society and culture ==
=== Economics ===
By being a combination it may reduce administrative costs and achieve a better uptake of the vaccine.

=== Brand names ===
Brand names include Twinrix, Twinrix Junior, Twinrix paediatric, Ambirix, and Bilive.
