= DTaP-Hib vaccine =

Combination vaccine

Combination of
- DTaP vaccine: Vaccine
- Hib vaccine: Vaccine

Clinical data
- Trade names: TriHIBit
- Routes of administration: Intramuscular injection
- ATC code: J07AG52 (WHO)

Identifiers
- CAS Number: 1670254-07-5

DTaP-Hib vaccine is a combination vaccine whose generic name is diphtheria and tetanus toxoids and acellular pertussis adsorbed with Haemophilus B conjugate vaccine, sometimes abbreviated to DTaP-Hib. It protects against the infectious diseases diphtheria, tetanus, pertussis, and Haemophilus influenzae type B.

A branded formulation was marketed in the US as TriHIBit by Sanofi Pasteur, and administered by using the Sanofi DTaP vaccine Tripedia to reconstitute the Sanofi Hib vaccine ActHIB. TriHIBit and Tripedia were discontinued in 2011.

== See also ==
- DPT vaccine
