= Hepatitis A vaccine =

Vaccine to prevent hepatitis A

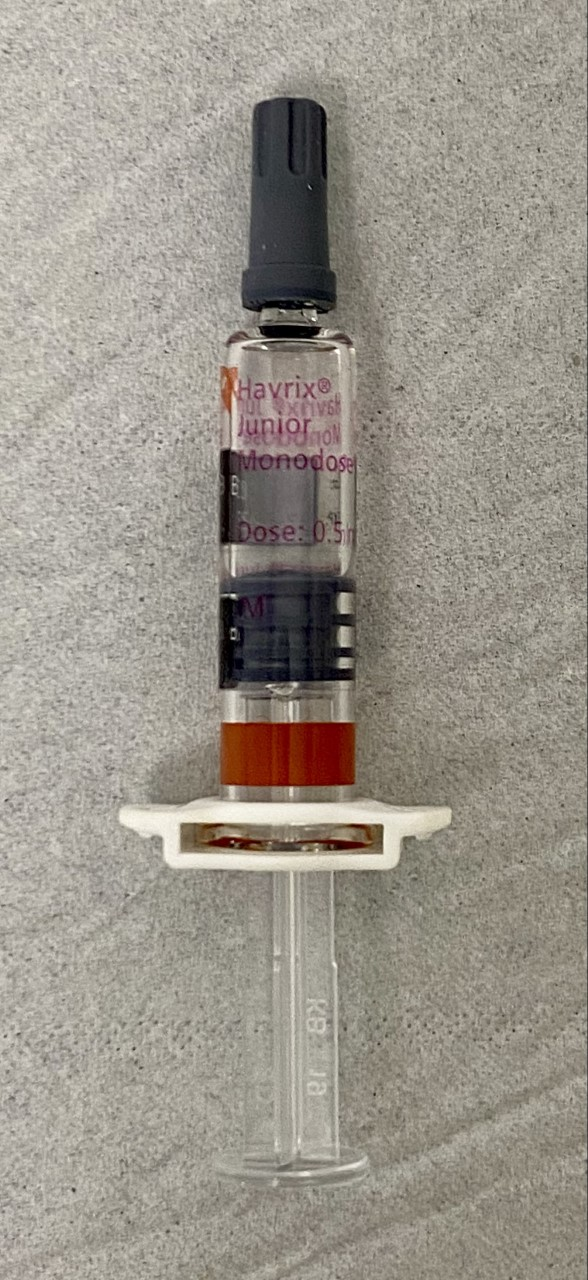
- Havrix junior monodose (hepatitis A) for children

Vaccine description
- Target: Hepatitis A virus
- Vaccine type: Inactivated or attenuated

Clinical data
- Trade names: Havrix, others
- AHFS/Drugs.com: Monograph
- MedlinePlus: a695003
- Pregnancy category: AU: B2
- Routes of administration: Intramuscular
- ATC code: J07BC02 (WHO)

Legal status
- Legal status: AU: S4 (Prescription only); US: ℞-only; EU: Rx-only; In general: ℞ (Prescription only)

Identifiers
- DrugBank: DB10989
- ChemSpider: none
- UNII: G54MT8V18G

Hepatitis A vaccine is a vaccine that prevents hepatitis A. It is effective in around 95% of cases and lasts for at least twenty years and possibly a person's entire life. If given, two doses are recommended beginning after the age of one. It is given by injection into a muscle. The first hepatitis A vaccine was approved in the European Union in 1991, and the United States in 1995. It is on the World Health Organization's List of Essential Medicines.

The World Health Organization (WHO) recommends universal vaccination in areas where the disease is moderately common. Where the disease is very common, widespread vaccination is not recommended as people typically develop immunity through infection during childhood. The US Centers for Disease Control and Prevention (CDC) recommends vaccinating:

- All children aged 12–23 months
- Unvaccinated children and adolescents aged 2–18 years
- International travelers
- Men who have sex with men
- People who use injection or non-injection drugs
- People who have an occupational risk for infection
- People who anticipate close contact with an international adoptee
- People experiencing homelessness
- People with HIV
- People with chronic liver disease
- Any person wishing to obtain immunity

In addition, a person who has not previously received hepatitis A vaccine and who has direct contact with someone with hepatitis A should get hepatitis A vaccine within two weeks after exposure.

Severe side effects are very rare. Pain at the site of injection occurs in about 15% of children and half of adults. Most hepatitis A vaccines contain inactivated virus while a few contain weakened virus. The ones with weakened virus are not recommended during pregnancy or in those with poor immune function. A few formulations combine hepatitis A with either hepatitis B or typhoid vaccine.

Soreness or redness where the shot is given, fever, headache, tiredness, or loss of appetite can happen after receiving the hepatitis A vaccine. As with any medicine, there is a very remote chance of a vaccine causing a severe allergic reaction, other serious injury, or death.

== Medical uses ==
Within the US, the vaccine Vaqta, developed by Maurice Hilleman and his team at Merck & Co. was licensed in 1995. The vaccine was phased in, around 1996, for children living in high-risk areas. In 1999, its usage was widened to areas with elevated levels of infection. In the US as of 2007, the vaccine is strongly recommended for all children 12 to 23 months of age in an attempt to eradicate the virus nationwide. Although the original Food and Drug Administration (FDA) license for Havrix by GlaxoSmithKline is dated 1995, it had been approved in Europe in 1991.

The US Centers for Disease Control and Prevention (CDC) recommends vaccination of all children over one year of age, people whose sexual activity puts them at risk, people with chronic liver disease, people who are being treated with clotting factor concentrates, people working near the virus, and people who are living in communities where an outbreak is present. Hepatitis A is the most common vaccine-preventable virus acquired during travel, so people traveling to places where the virus is common like the Indian subcontinent, Africa, Central America, South America, Asia, and Eastern Europe should be vaccinated.

The vaccine is given in the muscle of the upper arm, in two doses for the best protection. The initial dose of the vaccine should be followed up by a booster six to twelve months later. Protection against hepatitis A begins approximately two to four weeks after the initial vaccination. Protection lasts at least 15 years and is estimated to last at least 25 years if the booster is administered.

A Cochrane review found that both types of vaccines offer significant protection, for at least two years using the inactivated vaccine and at least five years with the attenuated vaccine. The review concluded that the inactivated vaccine is safe, but required more high-quality evidence to assess the safety of the attenuated vaccine.

== Commercial vaccines ==
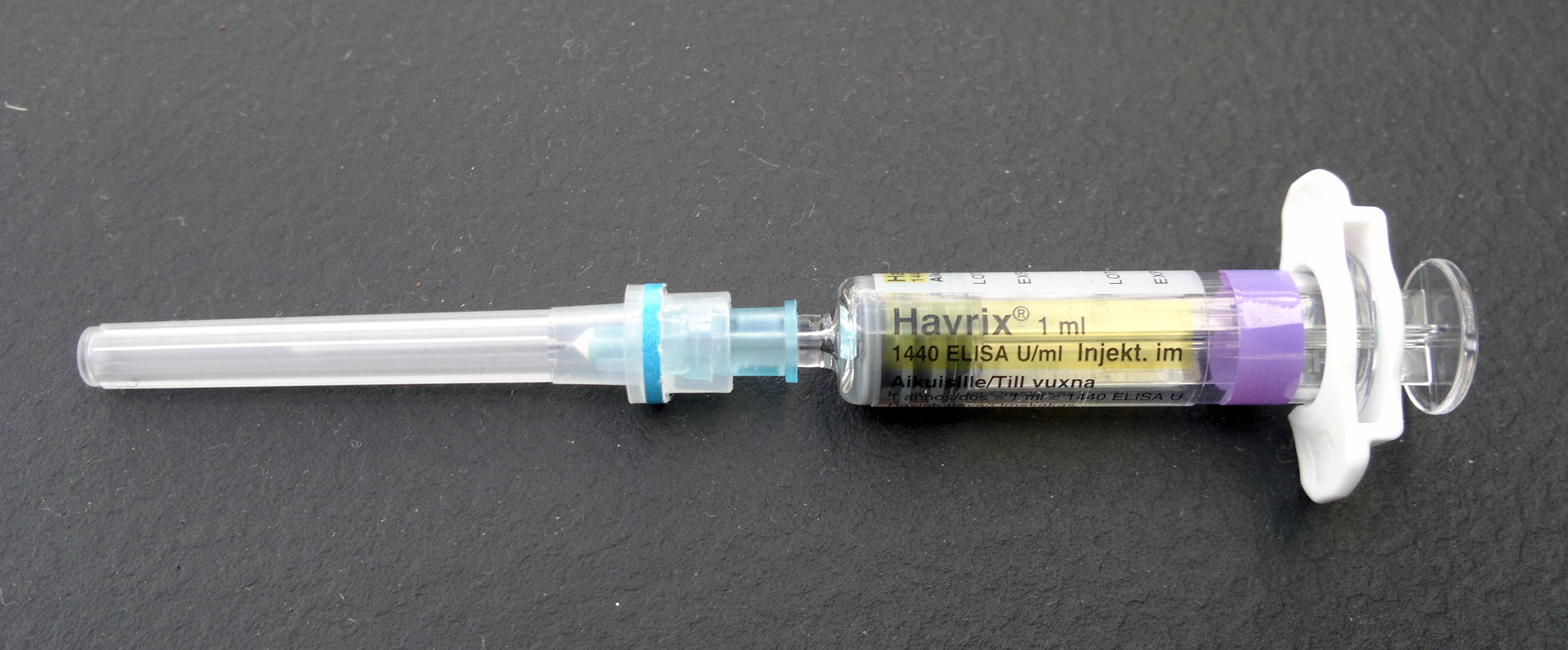
Havrix vaccine

Several commercial hepatitis A vaccines are available. The definition of (U)nits varies among manufacturers depending on how hepatitis A antigen is measured in their products.

- Avaxim: made by Sanofi Pasteur. Inactivated hepatitis A virus produced in MRC-5 cells. Each dose contains 160 U of antigen adsorbed on aluminium hydroxide (0.3 mg Al).
- Epaxal: made by Crucell. Also sold under the brand names HAVpur and VIROHEP-A. This vaccine consists of virosomes, artificial particles composed of synthetic lipids and influenza proteins in addition to the hepatitis A antigen. It does not contain aluminium.
- Havrix: made by GlaxoSmithKline. Inactivated hepatitis A virus produced in MRC-5 cells. Each adult dose contains 1440 ELISA units of viral antigen adsorbed on aluminium hydroxide (0.5 mg Al). The pediatric (child) doses contain half the amount of viral antigen and aluminium.
- Vaqta: made by Merck. Inactivated hepatitis A virus produced in MRC-5 cells. An adult dose contains 50 U of antigen adsorbed onto 0.45 mg of aluminium (as aluminium hydroxyphosphate sulfate); a child dose contains half the amounts of antigen and aluminium.

=== Combination vaccines ===
- Hepatitis A and B vaccine is a vaccine against hepatitis A and hepatitis B.
- Hepatitis A and typhoid vaccine is a vaccine against hepatitis A and typhoid.
