= Japanese encephalitis vaccine =

Vaccine against Japanese encephalitis

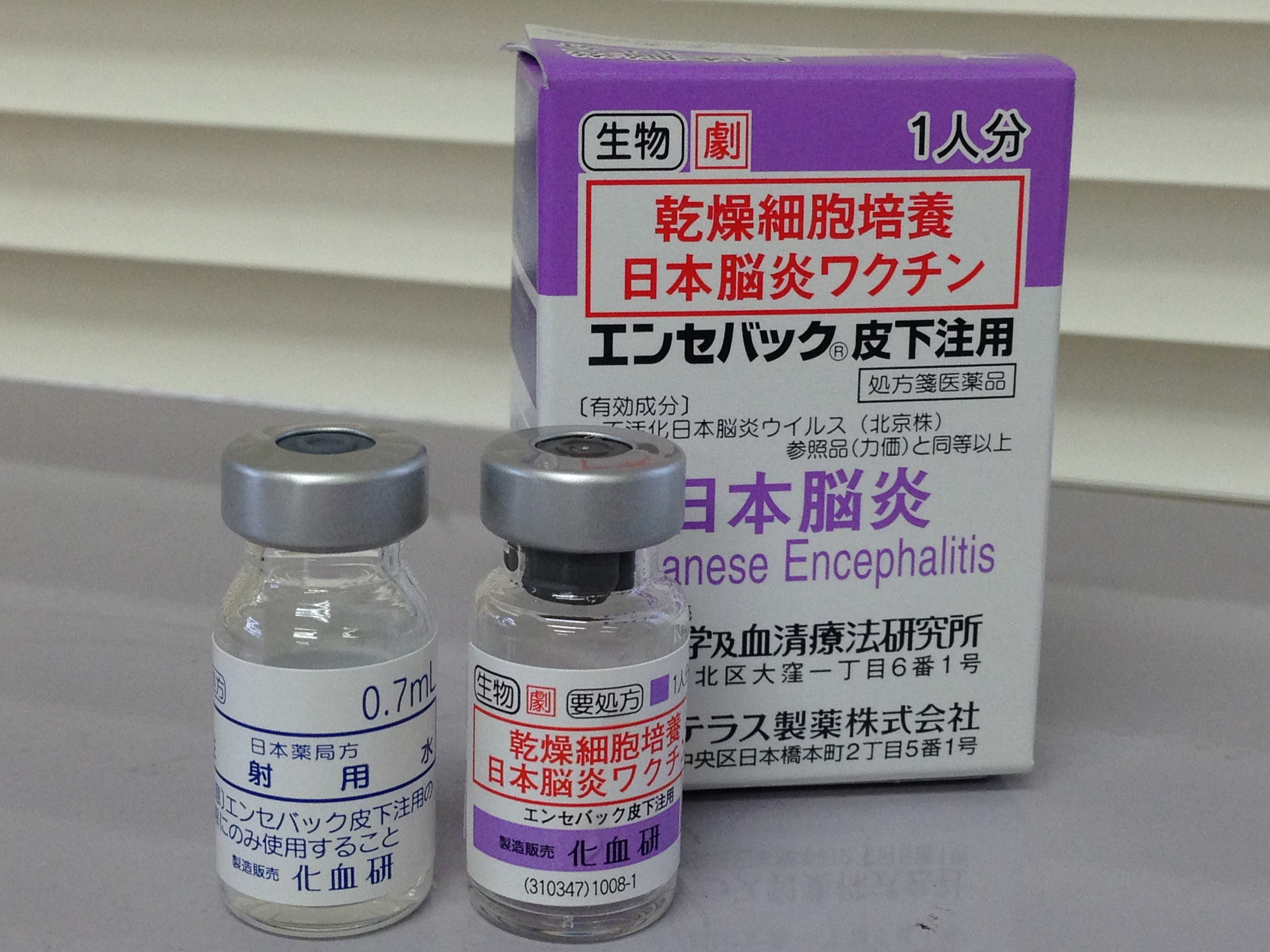
- Vials and packaging for the Japanese encephalitis vaccine Encevac

Vaccine description
- Target: Japanese encephalitis
- Vaccine type: Inactivated or attenuated

Clinical data
- Trade names: Ixiaro, Imojev
- AHFS/Drugs.com: Monograph
- MedlinePlus: a607019
- License data: US DailyMed: Ixiaro
- Pregnancy category: AU: B1
- ATC code: J07BA01 (WHO) J07BA02 (WHO) J07BA03 (WHO)

Legal status
- Legal status: UK: POM (Prescription only); US: ℞-only

Identifiers
- CAS Number: 1196872-36-2
- ChemSpider: none

Japanese encephalitis vaccine is a vaccine that protects against Japanese encephalitis. The vaccines are more than 90% effective. The duration of protection with the vaccine is not clear but its effectiveness appears to decrease over time. Doses are given either by injection into a muscle or just under the skin.

It is recommended as part of routine immunizations in countries where the disease is a problem. One or two doses are given depending on the version of the vaccine. Extra doses are not typically needed in areas where the disease is common. In those with HIV/AIDS or those who are pregnant an inactivated vaccine should be used. Immunization of travellers who plan to spend time outdoors in areas where the disease is common is recommended.

The vaccines are relatively safe. Pain and redness may occur at the site of injection. As of 2015, 15 different vaccines are available: some are based on recombinant DNA techniques, others weakened virus, and others inactivated virus.

The Japanese encephalitis vaccines first became available in the 1930s. It is on the World Health Organization's List of Essential Medicines.

== Efficacy ==
Randomized control trials on JE-VAX have shown that a two-dose schedule provides protection for one year.

== History ==
Japanese encephalitis vaccines first became available in the 1930s. One of them was an inactivated mouse brain-derived vaccine (the Nakayama and/or Beijing-1 strain), made by BIKEN and marketed by Sanofi Pasteur as JE-VAX, until production ceased in 2005. The other was an inactivated vaccine cultivated on primary hamster kidney cells (the Beijing-3 strain). The Beijing-3 strain was the main variant of the vaccine used in the People's Republic of China from 1968 until 2005.

Three second-generation vaccines have entered markets since then: SA14-14-2, IC51 and ChimeriVax-JE. The live-attenuated SA14-14-2 strain was introduced in China in 1988. It is much cheaper than alternative vaccines, and is administered to 20 million Chinese children each year.

A purified, formalin-inactivated, wholevirus vaccine known as IC51 (marketed in Australia and New Zealand as JESPECT and elsewhere as IXIARO) was licensed for use in the United States, Australia, and Europe during the spring of 2009. It is based on a SA14-14-2 strain and cultivated in Vero cells. In September 2012, the Indian firm Biological E. Limited launched an inactivated cell culture derived vaccine based on SA 14-14-2 strain which was developed in a technology transfer agreement with Intercell and is a thiomersal-free vaccine.

Another vaccine, a live-attenuated recombinant chimeric virus vaccine developed using the yellow fever virus known as ChimeriVax-JE (marketed as IMOJEV) was licensed for use in Australia in August 2010 and in Thailand in December 2012.
