= Potassium phosphate =

Group of chemical compounds

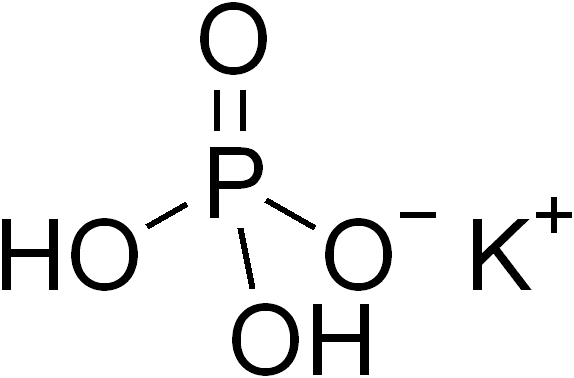
Monopotassium phosphate

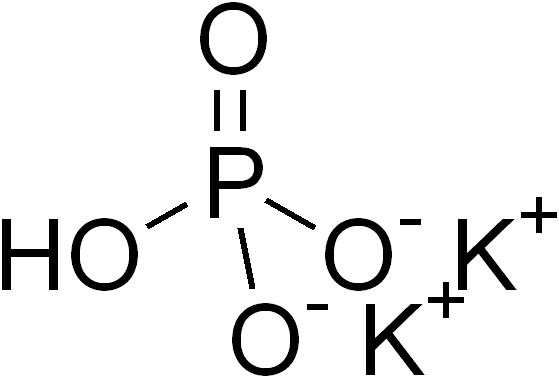
Dipotassium phosphate

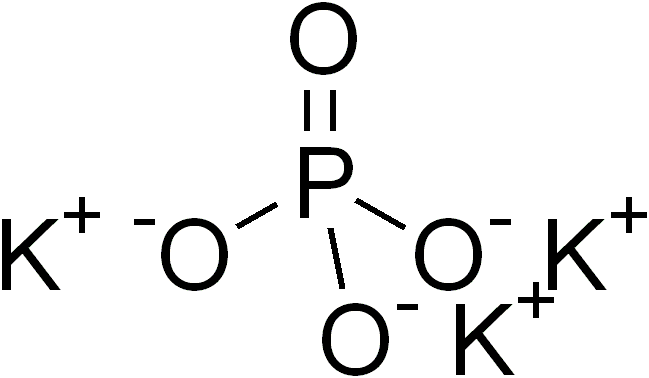
Tripotassium phosphate

Potassium phosphate is a generic term for the salts of potassium and phosphate ions including:

- Monopotassium phosphate (KH_{2}PO_{4}) (Molar mass approx: 136 g/mol)
- Dipotassium phosphate (K_{2}HPO_{4}) (Molar mass approx: 174 g/mol)
- Tripotassium phosphate (K_{3}PO_{4}) (Molar mass approx: 212.27 g/mol)

As food additives, potassium phosphates have the E number E340.
