= Hayflick limit =

Limit to divisions of a normal human cell

The Hayflick limit, or Hayflick phenomenon, is the number of times a normal somatic, differentiated human cell population will divide before cell division stops.

The concept of the Hayflick limit was advanced by American anatomist Leonard Hayflick in 1961, at the Wistar Institute in Philadelphia, Pennsylvania. Hayflick demonstrated that a normal human fetal cell population will divide between 40 and 60 times in cell culture before entering a senescence phase. This finding refuted the contention by Alexis Carrel that normal cells are immortal.

Hayflick interpreted his discovery to be aging at the cellular level. The aging of cell populations appears to correlate with the overall physical aging of an organism.

Macfarlane Burnet coined the name "Hayflick limit" in his book Intrinsic Mutagenesis: A Genetic Approach to Ageing, published in 1974.

== History ==
=== The belief in cell immortality ===
Prior to Leonard Hayflick's discovery, it was believed that vertebrate cells had an unlimited potential to replicate. Alexis Carrel, a Nobel Prize-winning surgeon, had stated "that all cells explanted in tissue culture are immortal, and that the lack of continuous cell replication was due to ignorance on how best to cultivate the cells". He claimed to have cultivated fibroblasts from the hearts of chickens (which typically live 5 to 10 years) and to have kept the culture growing for 34 years.

However, other scientists have been unable to replicate Carrel's results, and they are suspected to be due to an error in experimental procedure. To provide required nutrients, embryonic stem cells of chickens may have been re-added to the culture daily. This would have easily allowed the cultivation of new, fresh cells in the culture, so there was not an infinite reproduction of the original cells. It has been speculated that Carrel knew about this error, but he never admitted it.

Also, it has been theorized that the cells Carrel used were young enough to contain pluripotent stem cells, which, if supplied with a supporting telomerase-activation nutrient, would have been capable of staving off replicative senescence, or even possibly reversing it. Cultures not containing telomerase-active pluripotent stem cells would have been populated with telomerase-inactive cells, which would have been subject to the 50 ± 10 mitosis event limit until cellular senescence occurs as described in Hayflick's findings.

=== Experiment and discovery ===
Hayflick first became suspicious of Carrel's claims while working in a lab at the Wistar Institute. Hayflick noticed that one of his cultures of embryonic human fibroblasts had developed an unusual appearance and that cell division had slowed. Initially, he brushed this aside as an anomaly caused by contamination or technical error. However, he later observed other cell cultures exhibiting similar manifestations. Hayflick checked his research notebook and was surprised to find that the atypical cell cultures had all been cultured to approximately their 40th doubling while younger cultures never exhibited the same problems. Furthermore, conditions were similar between the younger and older cultures he observed—same culture medium, culture containers, and technician. This led him to doubt that the manifestations were due to contamination or technical error.

Hayflick next set out to prove that the cessation of normal cell replicative capacity that he observed was not the result of viral contamination, poor culture conditions or some unknown artifact. Hayflick teamed with Paul Moorhead for the definitive experiment to eliminate these as causative factors. As a skilled cytogeneticist, Moorhead was able to distinguish between male and female cells in culture. The experiment proceeded as follows: Hayflick mixed equal numbers of normal human male fibroblasts that had divided many times (cells at the 40th population doubling) with female fibroblasts that had divided fewer times (cells at the 15th population doubling). Unmixed cell populations were kept as controls. After 20 doublings of the mixed culture, only female cells remained. Cell division ceased in the unmixed control cultures at the anticipated times; when the male control culture stopped dividing, only female cells remained in the mixed culture. This suggested that technical errors or contaminating viruses were unlikely explanations as to why cell division ceased in the older cells, and proved that unless the virus or artifact could distinguish between male and female cells (which it could not) then the cessation of normal cell replication was governed by an internal counting mechanism.

These results disproved Carrel's immortality claims and established the Hayflick limit as a credible biological theory. Unlike Carrel's experiment, Hayflick's has been successfully repeated by other scientists.

== Cell phases ==
Hayflick describes three phases in the life of normal cultured cells. At the start of his experiment he named the primary culture "phase one". Phase two is defined as the period when cells are proliferating; Hayflick called this the time of "luxuriant growth". After months of doubling the cells eventually reach phase three, a phenomenon he named "senescence", where cell replication rate slows before halting altogether.

== Telomere length ==
The typical normal human fetal cell will divide between 50 and 70 times before experiencing senescence. As the cell divides, the telomeres on the ends of chromosomes shorten. The Hayflick limit is the limit on cell replication imposed by the shortening of telomeres with each division. This end stage is known as cellular senescence.

The Hayflick limit has been found to correlate with the length of the telomeric region at the end of chromosomes. During the process of DNA replication of a chromosome, small segments of DNA within each telomere are unable to be copied and are lost. This occurs due to the uneven nature of DNA replication, where leading and lagging strands are not replicated symmetrically. The telomeric region of DNA does not code for any protein; it is simply a repeated code on the end region of linear eukaryotic chromosomes. After many divisions, the telomeres reach a critical length and the cell becomes senescent. It is at this point that a cell has reached its Hayflick limit.

Hayflick was the first to report that only cancer cells are immortal. This could not have been demonstrated until he had demonstrated that normal cells are mortal. Cellular senescence does not occur in most cancer cells due to expression of an enzyme called telomerase. This enzyme extends telomeres, preventing the telomeres of cancer cells from shortening and giving them infinite replicative potential. A proposed treatment for cancer is the usage of telomerase inhibitors that would prevent the restoration of the telomere, allowing the cell to die like other body cells.

== Organismal aging ==
Hayflick suggested that his results in which normal cells have a limited replicative capacity may have significance for understanding human aging at the cellular level.

It has been reported that the limited replicative capability of human fibroblasts observed in cell culture is far greater than the number of replication events experienced by non-stem cells in vivo during a normal postnatal lifespan. In addition, it has been suggested that no inverse correlation exists between the replicative capacity of normal human cell strains and the age of the human donor from which the cells were derived, as previously argued. It is now clear that at least some of these variable results are attributable to the mosaicism of cell replication numbers at different body sites where cells were taken.

Comparisons of different species indicate that cellular replicative capacity may correlate primarily with species body mass, but more likely to species lifespan. Thus, the limited capacity of cells to replicate in culture may be directly relevant to the overall physical aging of an organism.

== See also ==
- Ageing
- Apoptosis
- Biological immortality
- HeLa cells
