= MRC-5 =

Cell line

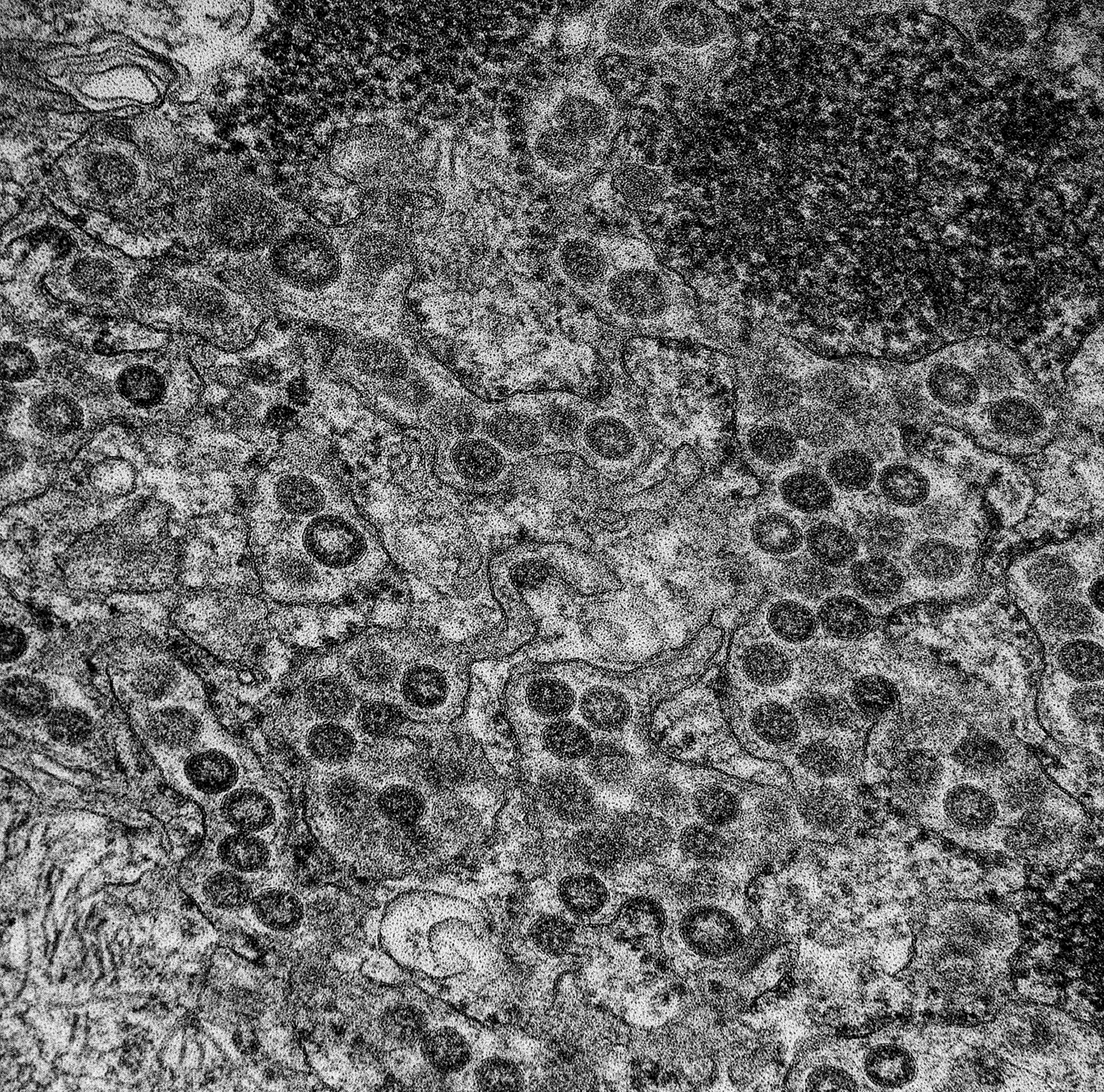
MRC-5 cell

MRC-5 (Medical Research Council cell strain 5) is a diploid cell culture line composed of fibroblasts, originally developed from the lung tissue of a 14-week-old aborted white male fetus. The cell line was isolated by J.P. Jacobs and colleagues in September 1966 from the seventh population doubling of the original strain, and MRC-5 cells themselves are known to reach senescence in around 45 population doublings.

== Applications ==
MRC-5 cells are currently used to produce several vaccines including for hepatitis A, varicella and polio. Also IMOVAX Rabies vaccine.

== Culture and society ==
During the COVID-19 pandemic, anti-vaccination and anti-abortion activists believed that MRC-5 was an ingredient of the Oxford–AstraZeneca COVID-19 vaccine, citing a study from the University of Bristol. David Matthews, a co-author for this study, clarified that MRC-5 was solely used for testing purposes to determine "how the Oxford vaccine behaves when it is inside a genetically normal human cell." The manufacturing of the vaccine used the HEK 293 fetal cell line, the kidney cells of an aborted or spontaneously miscarried female fetus, though the cells are filtered out of the final product.

== See also ==
- Use of fetal tissue in vaccine development
- WI-38
