= Hepatitis B vaccine =

Vaccine against hepatitis B

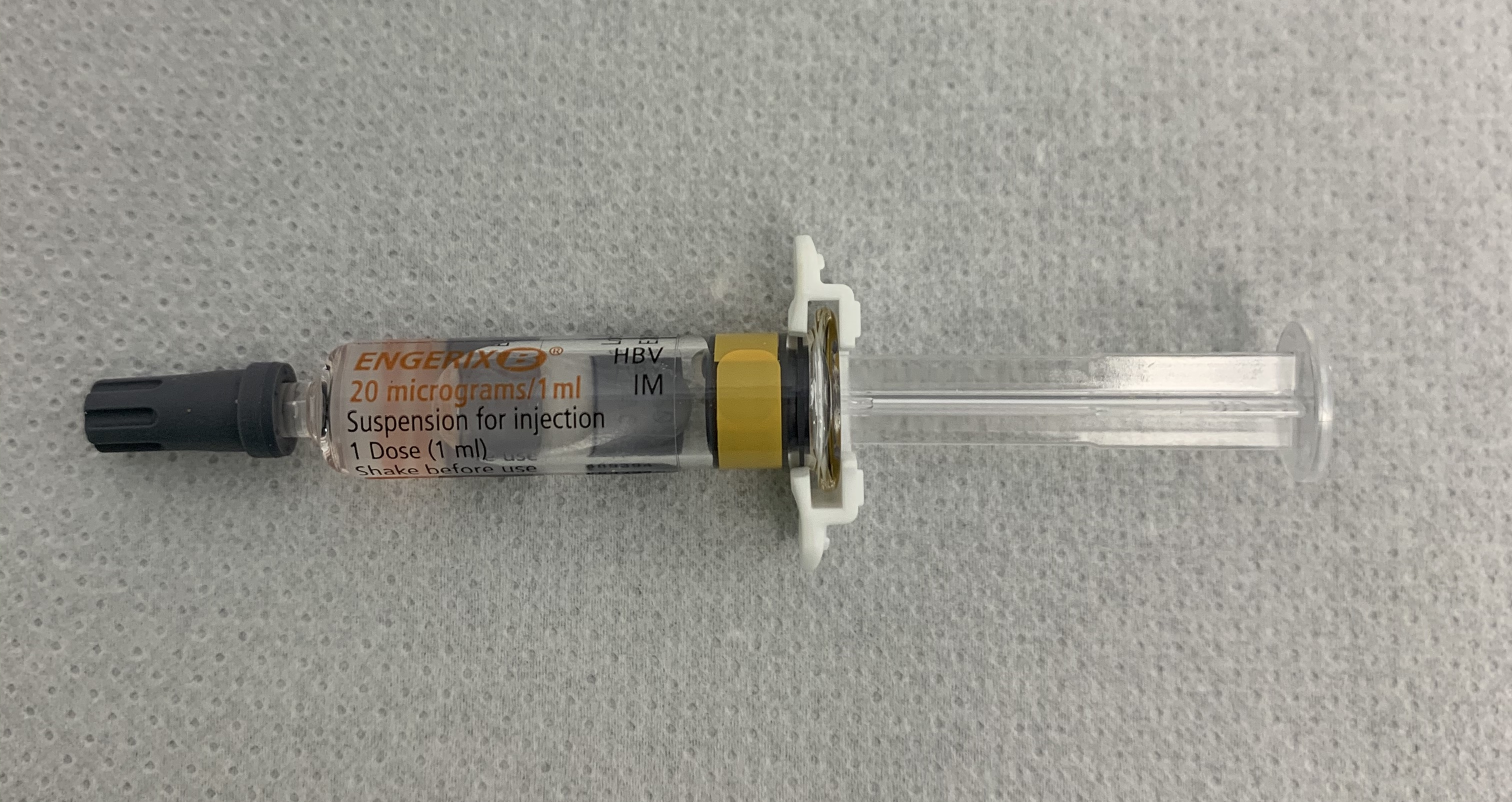
- Hepatitis B vaccine

Vaccine description
- Target: Hepatitis B virus
- Vaccine type: Subunit

Clinical data
- Trade names: Recombivax HB, Engerix-B, Heplisav-B, others
- AHFS/Drugs.com: Monograph
- MedlinePlus: a607014
- License data: US DailyMed: Hepatitis B vaccine
- Pregnancy category: AU: B2
- Routes of administration: Intramuscular (IM)
- Drug class: Antiviral
- ATC code: J07BC01 (WHO)

Legal status
- Legal status: UK: POM (Prescription only); US: ℞-only; EU: Rx-only; In general: ℞ (Prescription only)

Identifiers
- PubChem CID: 16131310
- DrugBank: DB11627
- ChemSpider: none
- UNII: IFJ010MNE4; XL4HLC6JH6
- KEGG: D04432

Hepatitis B vaccine is a vaccine that prevents hepatitis B. The first dose is recommended within 24 hours of birth with either two or three more doses given after that. The vaccine is also recommended to premature infants and people with poor immune function such as from HIV/AIDS. It is also recommended that health-care workers be vaccinated. In healthy people, routine immunization results in more than 95% of people being protected.

Blood testing to verify that the vaccine has worked is recommended in those at high risk. Additional doses may be needed in people with poor immune function but are not necessary for most people. In those who have been exposed to the hepatitis B virus but not immunized, hepatitis B immune globulin should be given in addition to the vaccine. The vaccine is given by injection into a muscle.

Serious side effects from the hepatitis B vaccine are very uncommon. Pain may occur at the site of injection. It is safe for use during pregnancy or while breastfeeding. It has not been linked to Guillain–Barré syndrome. Hepatitis B vaccines are produced with recombinant DNA techniques and contain immunologic adjuvant. They are available both by themselves and in combination with other vaccines.

The first hepatitis B vaccine (Merck's Heptavax-B) was approved in the United States in 1981. A recombinant version (Merck's Recombivax-HB) came to market in 1986. It is on the World Health Organization's List of Essential Medicines. Both versions were developed by Maurice Hilleman and his team.

== Medical uses ==
Hepatitis b vaccine immunization schedule

In the United States vaccination is recommended for nearly all babies at birth. Many countries routinely vaccinate infants against hepatitis B. In countries with high rates of hepatitis B infection, vaccination of newborns has not only reduced the risk of infection but has also led to a marked reduction in liver cancer. This was reported in Taiwan where the implementation of a nationwide hepatitis B vaccination program in 1984 was associated with a decline in the incidence of childhood hepatocellular carcinoma.

In the United Kingdom, the vaccine is given to all babies at birth and is also offered to people in various categories at higher risk, including men who have sex with men.

In many areas, vaccination against hepatitis B is also required for all health-care and laboratory staff. Both types of the vaccine, the plasma-derived vaccine and the recombinant vaccine, seem to be able to elicit similar protective anti-HBs levels.

The US Centers for Disease Control and Prevention (CDC) issued recommendations for vaccination against hepatitis B among people with diabetes. The World Health Organization (WHO) recommends a pentavalent vaccine, combining vaccines against diphtheria, tetanus, pertussis and Haemophilus influenzae type B with the vaccine against hepatitis B. There is not sufficient evidence on how effective this pentavalent vaccine is compared to the individual vaccines. A pentavalent vaccine combining vaccines against diphtheria, tetanus, pertussis, hepatitis B, and poliomyelitis is approved in the US and is recommended by the Advisory Committee on Immunization Practices.

Hepatitis B vaccination, hepatitis B immunoglobulin, and the combination of hepatitis B vaccine plus hepatitis B immunoglobulin, are all considered as preventive for babies born to mothers infected with hepatitis B virus. The combination is superior for protecting these infants. The effectiveness of being vaccinated during pregnancy to prevent vertical transmission of hepatitis B to infants has not been studied. Hepatitis B immunoglobulin before birth has not been well studied.

=== Effectiveness ===
Studies have found that that immune memory against HepB is sustained for at least 30 years after vaccination, and protects against clinical disease and chronic HepB infection, even in cases where anti-hepatitis B surface antigen (anti-Hbs) levels decline below detectable levels. Testing to confirm successful immunization or sustained immunity is not necessary or recommended for most people, but is recommended for infants born to a mother who tests positive for HBsAg or whose HBsAg status is not known; for healthcare and public safety workers; for immunocompromised people such as haemodialysis patients, HIV patients, haematopoietic stem cell transplant [HSCT] recipients, or people receiving chemotherapy; and for sexual partners of HBsAg-positive people.

An anti-Hbs antibody level above 100 mIU/ml is deemed adequate and occurs in about 85–90% of individuals. An antibody level between 10 and 100 mIU/ml is considered a poor response, and these people should receive a single booster vaccination at this time, but do not need further retesting. People who fail to respond (anti-Hbs antibody level below 10 mIU/ml) should be tested to exclude current or past hepatitis B infection, and given a repeat course of three vaccinations, followed by further retesting 1–4 months after the second course. Those who still do not respond to a second course of vaccination may respond to intradermal injection or to a high dose vaccine or to a double dose of a combined hepatitis A and B vaccine. Those who still fail to respond will require hepatitis B immunoglobulin (HBIG) if later exposed to the hepatitis B virus.

Poor responses are mostly associated with being over the age of 40 years, obesity, celiac disease, and tobacco smoking, and also in alcoholics, especially if with advanced liver disease. People who are immunosuppressed or on dialysis may not respond as well and require larger or more frequent doses of vaccine. At least one study suggests that hepatitis B vaccination is less effective in patients with HIV. The immune response to the hepatitis B vaccine can be impaired by the presence of parasitic infections such as helminthiasis.

The HepB vaccine is vital for use for infants who contract HepB. 90% of infants who contract HepB and do not receive the vaccination will develop chronic infection. These chronic hepatitis B virus infections are life-threatening, with a 15–25% risk of death from complications.

=== Duration of protection ===
The hepatitis B vaccine is believed to provide indefinite protection. Older literature assumed that immunity would wane with antibody titers and only effectively last five to seven years, but immune-challenge studies show that even after 30 years, the immune system maintains the ability to produce an anamnestic response, i.e. to rapidly bump up antibody levels when the previously seen antigen is detected. This shows that the immunological memory is not affected by the loss of antibody levels. As a result, subsequent antibody testing and administration of booster doses is not required in successfully vaccinated immunocompetent individuals. UK guidelines suggest that people who respond to the vaccine and are at risk of occupational exposure, such as for healthcare workers, a single booster is recommended five years after initial immunization.

== Side effects ==
Serious side effects from the hepatitis B vaccine are very rare. Pain may occur at the site of injection. It is generally considered safe for use, during pregnancy or while breastfeeding. It has not been linked to Guillain–Barré syndrome.

=== Multiple sclerosis ===
Several studies have looked for an association between recombinant hepatitis B vaccine and multiple sclerosis (MS) in adults. Most studies do not support a causal relationship between hepatitis B vaccination and demyelinating diseases such as MS. A 2004 study reported a significant increase in risk within three years of vaccination. Some of these studies were criticized for methodological problems. This controversy created public misgivings about hepatitis B vaccination, and hepatitis B vaccination in children remained low in several countries. A 2006 study concluded that evidence did not support an association between hepatitis B vaccination and sudden infant death syndrome, chronic fatigue syndrome, or multiple sclerosis. A 2007 study found that the vaccination does not seem to increase the risk of a first episode of MS in childhood. Hepatitis B vaccination has not been linked to onset of autoimmune diseases in adulthood.

== Usage ==
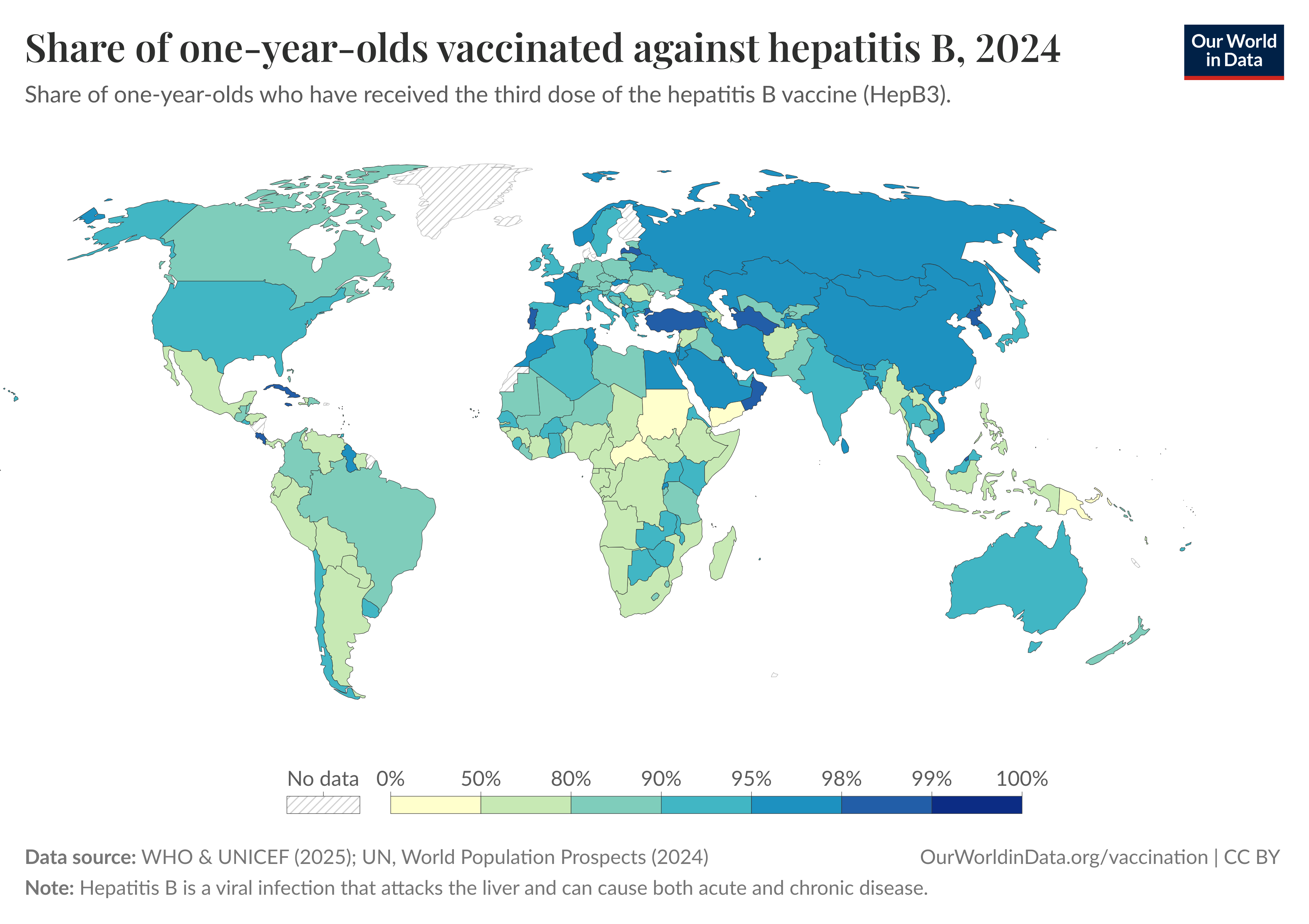
Share of one-year-olds vaccinated against hepatitis B, 2017

The following is a list of countries by the percentage of infants receiving three doses of hepatitis B vaccine as published by the World Health Organization (WHO) in 2017 compared to 2022.

Hepatitis B (HepB3) immunization coverage among one-year-olds worldwide
Country	2017 Coverage	2022 Coverage
Afghanistan	66	69
Albania	99	97
Algeria	91	77
Andorra	98	96
Angola	56	42
Antigua and Barbuda	95	99
Argentina	86	81
Armenia	94	96
Australia	95	94
Austria	90	84
Azerbaijan	95	83
Bahamas	94	87
Bahrain	98	97
Bangladesh	98	98
Barbados	90	86
Belarus	98	98
Belgium	97	97
Belize	88	84
Benin	76	76
Bhutan	98	98
Bolivia (Plurinational State of)	84	69
Bosnia and Herzegovina	77	78
Botswana	95	86
Brazil	82	77
Brunei Darussalam	99	99
Bulgaria	92	91
Burkina Faso	91	91
Burundi	91	91
Côte d'Ivoire	83	76
Cabo Verde	97	94
Cambodia	90	85
Cameroon	74	68
Canada	71	83
Central African Republic	42	42
Chad	41	60
Chile	93	96
China	99	99
Colombia	92	87
Comoros	91	88
Congo	69	78
Cook Islands	99	72
Costa Rica	97	94
Croatia	92	90
Cuba	99	99
Cyprus	97	94
Czechia	94	94
Democratic People's Republic of Korea	97	0
Democratic Republic of the Congo	71	65
Djibouti	76	59
Dominica	91	92
Dominican Republic	81	87
Ecuador	85	70
Egypt	94	97
El Salvador	92	75
Equatorial Guinea	53	53
Eritrea	95	95
Estonia	92	85
Eswatini	90	97
Ethiopia	68	65
Fiji	91	99
France	90	95
Gabon	75	60
Gambia	92	79
Georgia	91	85
Germany	88	87
Ghana	99	99
Greece	96	96
Grenada	96	77
Guatemala	91	79
Guinea	47	47
Guinea-Bissau	79	74
Guyana	97	98
Haiti	64	51
Honduras	90	78
India	89	93
Indonesia	85	86
Iran (Islamic Republic of)	99	99
Iraq	81	93
Ireland	95	93
Israel	97	96
Italy	94	95
Jamaica	93	98
Japan	no data	96
Jordan	99	77
Kazakhstan	99	99
Kenya	82	90
Kiribati	90	91
Kuwait	99	96
Kyrgyzstan	92	90
Lao People's Democratic Republic	84	80
Latvia	98	95
Lebanon	80	67
Lesotho	87	87
Liberia	80	78
Libya	96	73
Lithuania	94	90
Luxembourg	94	96
Madagascar	65	57
Malawi	88	86
Malaysia	98	96
Maldives	99	99
Mali	77	77
Malta	88	98
Marshall Islands	82	87
Mauritania	76	76
Mauritius	96	95
Mexico	58	83
Micronesia (Federated States of)	80	75
Monaco	99	99
Mongolia	99	95
Montenegro	73	45
Morocco	99	99
Mozambique	88	61
Myanmar	89	71
Namibia	88	84
Nauru	87	98
Nepal	90	90
Netherlands	92	88
New Zealand	94	89
Nicaragua	98	92
Niger	85	84
Nigeria	55	62
Niue	99	99
North Macedonia	91	84
Norway	no data	96
Occupied Palestinian Territory, including east Jerusalem	99	99
Oman	99	99
Pakistan	75	85
Palau	98	87
Panama	81	87
Papua New Guinea	36	36
Paraguay	91	69
Peru	89	82
Philippines	80	72
Poland	93	90
Portugal	98	99
Qatar	97	98
Republic of Korea	98	97
Republic of Moldova	89	90
Romania	92	85
Russian Federation	97	97
Rwanda	98	98
Saint Kitts and Nevis	98	96
Saint Lucia	80	81
Saint Vincent and the Grenadines	99	99
Samoa	67	76
San Marino	82	91
São Tomé and Príncipe	95	97
Saudi Arabia	98	98
Senegal	93	88
Serbia	93	92
Seychelles	97	97
Sierra Leone	90	91
Singapore	96	96
Slovakia	96	97
Slovenia	no data	89
Solomon Islands	83	89
Somalia	42	42
South Africa	84	85
Spain	94	93
Sri Lanka	99	98
Sudan	95	84
Suriname	67	77
Sweden	76	94
Switzerland	69	76
Syrian Arab Republic	48	46
Tajikistan	96	97
Thailand	99	97
Timor-Leste	83	86
Togo	83	82
Tonga	99	99
Trinidad and Tobago	89	93
Tunisia	98	97
Turkiye	96	99
Turkmenistan	99	98
Tuvalu	96	91
Uganda	94	89
Ukraine	52	62
United Arab Emirates	98	95
United Republic of Tanzania	90	88
United Kingdom of Great Britain and Northern Ireland	no data	92
United States of America	91	93
Uruguay	93	94
Uzbekistan	99	99
Vanuatu	85	68
Venezuela (Bolivarian Republic of)	66	56
Viet Nam	94	91
Yemen	68	74
Zambia	94	82
Zimbabwe	89	90

According to the CDC, 34.2% of all adults over the age of 18 in the United States have received at least one HepB vaccine. Vaccine uptake varies across demographics such race, age, and travel status. With 53.5% of Asian adults aged 19–49 years having had at least one HepB vaccine compared to 48.4% of White adults, 34.4% of Black adults, and 37.5% of Hispanic adults. These numbers are lower for adults aged 30–59 years; with 47.0% of Asian adults aged 30–59 having had at least one HepB vaccine, 38.4% of White adults, 31.2% of Black adults, and 31.5% of Hispanic adults. The CDC also reports higher HepB vaccine uptake for adults who travel compared to those who do not, 43.1% compared to 28.7%.

== History ==
=== Preliminary work ===
In 1963, the American physician/geneticist Baruch Blumberg, working at the Fox Chase Cancer Center, discovered what he called the "Australia Antigen" (HBsAg) in the serum of an Australian Aboriginal person. In 1968, this protein was found to be part of the virus that causes "serum hepatitis" (hepatitis B) by virologist Alfred Prince.

In 1976, Blumberg won the Nobel Prize in Physiology or Medicine for his work on hepatitis B (sharing it with Daniel Carleton Gajdusek for his work on kuru). Blumberg had identified Australia antigen, the important first step, and later discovered the way to make the first hepatitis B vaccine. Blumberg's vaccine was a unique approach to the production of a vaccine; that is, obtaining the immunizing antigen directly from the blood of human carriers of the virus. In October 1969, acting on behalf of the Institute for Cancer Research, they applied for a patent for the production of a vaccine. This patent [USP 3,636,191] was subsequently (January 1972) granted in the United States and other countries. In 2002, Blumberg published a book, Hepatitis B: The Hunt for a Killer Virus. In the book, Blumberg wrote: "It took some time before the concept was accepted by virologists and vaccine manufacturers who were more accustomed to dealing with vaccines produced by attenuation of viruses, or the use of killed viruses produced in tissue culture, or related viruses that were non-pathogenic protective (i.e., smallpox). However, by 1971, we were able to interest Merck, which had considerable experience with vaccines."

=== Blood-derived vaccine ===
During the next few years, a series of human and primate observations by scientists including Maurice Hilleman (who was responsible for vaccines at Merck), S. Krugman, R. Purcell, P. Maupas, and others provided additional support for the vaccine. In 1980, the results of the first field trial were published by W. Szmuness and his colleagues in New York City.

The American microbiologist/vaccinologist Maurice Hilleman at Merck used three treatments (pepsin, urea and formaldehyde) of blood serum together with rigorous filtration to yield a product that could be used as a safe vaccine. Hilleman hypothesized that he could make an hepatitis B virus vaccine by injecting patients with hepatitis B surface protein. In theory, this would be very safe, as these excess surface proteins lacked infectious viral DNA. The immune system, recognizing the surface proteins as foreign, would manufacture specially shaped antibodies, custom-made to bind to, and destroy, these proteins. Then, in the future, if the patient were infected with hepatitis B virus, the immune system could promptly deploy protective antibodies, destroying the viruses before they could do any harm.

Hilleman collected blood from gay men and intravenous drug users—groups known to be at risk for viral hepatitis. This was in the late 1970s when HIV was yet unknown to medicine. In addition to the sought-after hepatitis B surface proteins, the blood samples likely contained HIV. Hilleman devised a multistep process to purify this blood so that only the hepatitis B surface proteins remained. Every known virus was killed by this process, and Hilleman was confident that the vaccine was safe.

The first large-scale trials for the blood-derived vaccine were performed on gay men, due to their high-risk status. Later, Hilleman's vaccine was falsely blamed for igniting the AIDS epidemic. (See Wolf Szmuness) But, although the purified blood vaccine seemed questionable, it was determined to have indeed been free of HIV. The purification process had destroyed all viruses—including HIV. The vaccine was approved in 1981.

=== Recombinant vaccine ===
The blood-derived hepatitis B vaccine was withdrawn from the marketplace in 1986, replaced by Maurice Hilleman's improved recombinant hepatitis B vaccine which was approved by the FDA on 23 July 1986. It was the first human vaccine produced by recombinant DNA methods. For this work, scientists at Merck & Co. collaborated with William J. Rutter and colleagues at the University of California at San Francisco, as well as Benjamin Hall and colleagues at the University of Washington. In 1981, William J. Rutter, Pablo DT Valenzuela and Edward Penhoet (UC Berkeley) co-founded the Chiron Corporation in Emeryville, California, which collaborated with Merck.

The recombinant vaccine is based on a hepatitis B surface antigen (HBsAg) gene inserted into yeast (Saccharomyces cerevisiae) cells which are free of any concerns associated with human blood products. This allows the yeast to produce only the noninfectious surface protein, without any danger of introducing actual viral DNA into the final product. The vaccine contains the adjuvant amorphous aluminum hydroxyphosphate sulfate.

In 2017, a two-dose hepatitis B virus vaccine for adults, Heplisav-B gained U.S. Food and Drug Administration (FDA) approval. It uses recombinant HB surface antigen, similar to previous vaccines, but includes a novel CpG 1018 adjuvant, a 22-mer phosphorothioate-linked oligodeoxynucleotide. It was non-inferior concerning immunogenicity.

In November 2021, a new hepatitis B recombinant subunit vaccine (Prehevbrio) was approved by the FDA.

=== Immunization schedule ===
The Advisory Committee on Immunization Practices of the US Centers for Disease Control and Prevention (CDC) first recommended the vaccine for all newborns in 1991.

The CDC has varying hepatitis B vaccination schedule recommendations depending on the birth weight of the infant and hepatitis B status of the birth mother. For infants born to mothers with a negative hepatitis B antigen test, who weight at least 2000 grams, the first hepatitis B vaccination is recommended in the first 24 hours of life, the second dose between 1 and 2 months, and the third dose between 6 and 18 months. For infants born to mothers with a negative hepatitis B antigen test, who weight less than 2000 grams, the first hepatitis B vaccination is recommended at one months of age or hospital discharge (whichever comes first). For infants born to hepatitis B positive mothers, hepatitis B vaccine is recommended in the first twelve hours of birth as well as administration of hepatitis B immune globulin. For infants born to mothers with an unknown hepatitis B status, hepatitis B vaccination is recommended in the first twelve hours of life. For infants born to mothers with positive or unknown hepatitis B status, a follow up screening is recommended between 9 and 12 months.

== Manufacture ==
The vaccine contains one of the viral envelope proteins, hepatitis B surface antigen (HBsAg). The HBsAg gene is inserted into yeast cells through recombinant DNA technology, prompting the yeast cells to produce the antigen. Afterward an immune system antibody to HBsAg is established in the bloodstream. The antibody is known as anti-HBs. This antibody and immune system memory then provide immunity to hepatitis B virus infection.

== Society and culture ==
=== Legal status ===
In December 2020, the Committee for Medicinal Products for Human Use (CHMP) of the European Medicines Agency adopted a positive opinion, recommending the granting of a marketing authorization for the medicinal product Heplisav B, intended for the active immunization against hepatitis B virus infection. The applicant for this medicinal product is Dynavax GmbH. It was approved for medical use in the European Union in February 2021.

In February 2022, the CHMP adopted a positive opinion, recommending the granting of a marketing authorization for the medicinal product PreHevbri, intended for the active immunization against hepatitis B virus infection. The applicant for this medicinal product is VBI Vaccines B.V. PreHevbri was approved for medical use in the European Union in April 2022.

In December 2025, the Advisory Committee on Immunization Practices panel of the US Centers for Disease Control and Prevention recommended individual-based decision-making for parents deciding whether to give the hepatitis B vaccine to infants born to women who test negative for the virus.

=== Brand names ===
The common brands available are Recombivax HB (Merck), Engerix-B (GSK), Elovac B (Human Biologicals Institute, a division of Indian Immunologicals Limited), Genevac B (Serum Institute), Shanvac B, Heplisav-B, Prehevbrio, and Euvax B (LG Chem).

Twinrix (GSK) is a vaccine against hepatitis A and hepatitis B.

Pediarix is a vaccine against diphtheria, tetanus, pertussis, hepatitis B, and poliomyelitis.

Vaxelis is a vaccine against diphtheria, tetanus, pertussis, poliomyelitis, Haemophilus influenzae type B (Meningococcal Protein Conjugate), and hepatitis B.

Fendrix (hepatitis B (rDNA) vaccine (adjuvanted, adsorbed)) was approved for medical use in the European Union in 2005.
