= Mumps vaccine (disambiguation) =

Mumps vaccines are vaccines which prevent mumps.

Mumps vaccine may also refer to

- Mumpsvax, a mumps vaccine manufactured by Merck

== See also ==
- MMR vaccine, a vaccine against measles, mumps, and rubella
- MMRV vaccine, a vaccine against measles, mumps, rubella, and varicella (chickenpox)
