= Vaccines for Children Program =

Federally funded program in the US

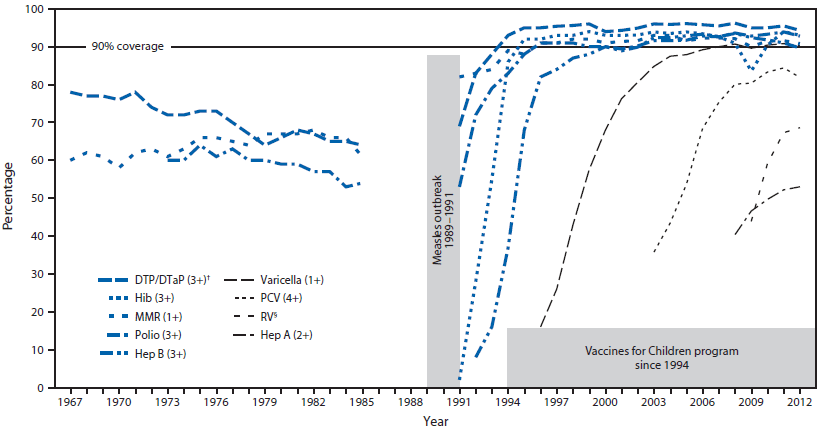
Vaccination rates for preschool-aged children from 1967–2012, with Vaccines for Children program era marked. Immunization rates for all pre-school aged children increased to at least 90% for most vaccines in the 1990s. It is difficult to discern if this increase was directly caused by the VFC program. (Abbreviations: DTP/DTaP = diphtheria, tetanus, pertussis or diphtheria, tetanus, acellular pertussis; MMR = measles, mumps, and rubella; Hib = Haemophilus influenzae type b; Hep B = hepatitis B; PCV = pneumococcal conjugate vaccine; RV = rotavirus vaccine; Hep A = hepatitis A.)

The Vaccines for Children Program (VFC) is a federally funded program in the United States providing no-cost vaccines to children who lack health insurance or who otherwise cannot afford the cost of the vaccination. The VFC program was created by the Omnibus Budget Reconciliation Act of 1993 and is required to be a new entitlement of each state's Medicaid plan under section 1928 of the Social Security Act. The program was officially implemented in October 1994 and serves eligible children in all U.S. states, as well as the Commonwealth of Puerto Rico, the U.S. Virgin Islands, American Samoa, Guam, and the Commonwealth of the Northern Mariana Islands.

== History ==
From 1989 through 1991, a measles epidemic in the United States resulted in over 55,000 reported cases of measles, 11,000 measles-related hospitalization, and 123 deaths. Upon investigation, Centers for Disease Control and Prevention (CDC) found that more than half of the children who had measles had not been immunized, despite seeing a health care provider. In partial response to that epidemic, Congress passed the Omnibus Budget Reconciliation Act (OBRA) on August 10, 1993, creating the VFC Program; the VFC program officially became operational October 1, 1994.

The Vaccines for Children program represented a major vaccine finance reform, working as a state-operated federal entitlement program that supplied both public and private providers with federally purchased vaccines. This integration of both the public and private sector benefitted all providers. Because private providers now had a role in the nation's immunization program, they, along with the public health sector, benefitted from the supply of vaccines at no cost, educational opportunities, and the ability to provide immunization services to patients without a need for referral. As of 2019, there are over 44,000 doctors at 40,000 locations enrolled in the VFC program nationwide.

== Outcomes and impact ==
By eliminating or reducing cost as a barrier to vaccination, the VFC program encourages improved vaccination coverage among eligible children. Increased vaccination protects not only vaccinated child themselves, but also indirectly protects those around them through herd immunity, which can slow or stop the spread of disease. Thus childhood vaccination, as opposed to vaccination later in life, is particularly effective as a means of controlling and preventing disease spread.

The VFC program results in millions of immunizations each year. In 2010 alone 82 million VFC vaccine doses were administered to approximately 40 million children. Due to the exponential impact of vaccination, it is difficult to separate the effect of the VFC from that of other state and federal immunization programs. For example, it is difficult (or perhaps impossible) to disentangle the effects of the VFC program and the increase in public school vaccination requirements that occurred during the 1990s and 2000s. Thus, research primarily focuses the overall effect of increased childhood immunization that began in the mid-1990s, much (but not all) of which is owed to the VFC program.

The CDC estimates that among children born from 1994 to 2013 (that is, children born during the VFC-era), "routine childhood immunization... [will] prevent 322 million illnesses (averaging 4.1 illnesses per child) and 21 million hospitalizations (0.27 per child) over the course of their lifetimes and avert 732,000 premature deaths from vaccine-preventable illnesses". All told, vaccination among this birth cohort will prevent an estimated 8.9 million measles-related hospitalization and 507,000 diphtheria-related deaths. These rates do not include prevented hospitalizations and deaths resulting from annual influenza immunizations, which the VFC also provides. Additionally, these estimates do not account for the rise in US population during this time period. Both of these factors have the potential to make the CDC's estimates artificially low.

The VFC program has also significantly helped close the vaccination rate gap between non-Hispanic whites and other racial groups. During the measles epidemic of 1989–1991, racial/ethnic minority children were 16 times more likely than non-Hispanic white children to contract measles. Due in part to the VFC program, there have been no racial/ethnic disparities in measles-mumps-rubella vaccination in the United States since 2005, and racial disparities for other vaccinations have declined or become absent entirely, depending upon the vaccination and the racial group studied. Overall, while immunization disparities still exist for newer vaccines (i.e. HepA, rotovirus, and HPV), the VFC has effectively eliminated the immunization gap for older vaccines like MMR, polio, and HepB.

Vaccination programs like the VFC are expensive, but they also result in significant cost savings through prevented hospitalization and doctor visits. Routine childhood vaccination among the 1994-2013 birth cohort is estimated to result in $107 billion in direct costs and $121 billion in social costs. In return, childhood vaccination results in the aversion of $402 billion in direct costs and $1.5 trillion in societal costs. This gives vaccination a net present value (net savings) of $295 billion and $1.38 trillion in direct and societal costs, respectively.

Due to the VFC program, the Federal government of the United States currently purchases between 52 and 55 percent of childhood vaccines administered in the United States. Such large-scale purchases by the federal government are not without economic consequences; the VFC program is one factor contributing to the current deterioration of the U.S. vaccination market. Thirty years ago, dozens of manufacturers produced vaccines for the U.S. market, but today just five companies produce all of the vaccines for children and adults in the United States. The opportunity for large government contracts has led pharmaceutical companies to engage in such aggressive price competition that the market for vaccinations has all but collapsed. This collapse has occurred despite the fact that the U.S. vaccine market has been expanding for decades and is expected to continue expanding. This poses significant problems in the area of vaccine research and development, as there is currently little incentive for innovation within the market.

== Program ==
The VFC program is funded through an approval by the Office of Management and Budget (OMB), and the funds are allocated to the Centers for Disease Control and Prevention (CDC). The CDC buys vaccines at a discount directly from manufacturers and distributes them to state health departments and certain local and territorial public health agencies. The agencies then redistribute the vaccines at no cost to those private physicians' offices and public health clinics that are registered as VFC program providers. Though the National Center for Immunization and Respiratory Diseases (NCIRD) (previously known as NIP) at CDC is responsible for policy development, state health departments are responsible for management of the VFC program at the state and local level. Most states thus coordinate their state-level immunization programs with the VFC. The successful implementation of the VFC at the state-wide level thus requires the cooperation and coordination of several state and federal agencies, including: The Centers for Medicare and Medicaid Services; the Special Supplemental Nutrition Program for Women, Infants, and Children (WIC); the Children's Health Insurance Program (CHIP); and the Health Resources and Services Administration (HRSA), among others. In fact, many parents first learn about the VFC program through other federal or state programs that they may or their children already participate in, like WIC or CHIP. The participation and cooperation of Medicaid is particularly important, as the majority of VFC-eligible children are also eligible for Medicaid; state and local Medicaid agencies thus play a crucial role in informing potentially eligible patients about the VFC program, as well as recruiting private physicians to participate in the program.

== Patient eligibility ==
Children and adolescents are eligible if it is before their 19th birthday and if they meet one or more of the following criteria:

- Medicaid-eligible
- Uninsured (lacking health insurance)
- American Indian or Alaska Native
- Underinsured*

Based upon these guidelines, the CDC estimates that approximately 50% of children under 19 years old are eligible for VFC benefits.

* Underinsured means that a child that is covered by some type of health insurance, but the insurance either does not cover any vaccines, covers only certain vaccines, or does cover some vaccines, but has a cap on the annual cost for vaccines*. Underinsured children and adolescents may only receive vaccines at sites that are federally qualified health centers (FQHCs) or rural health clinics (RHCs). Each state has an administrative fee set by the state that can never be exceeded, of about US$15.

As of 2018, many children have benefited from the VFC program, which has saved nearly 936,000 from preventable diseases. Many families are benefiting from this program as it covers vaccines and helps with the costs of vaccines for low-income families. Records indicate that from 1994 to 2012 after immunizations began to rise, diseases such as polio and hepatitis B decreased drastically.

== Covered vaccines ==
The Advisory Committee on Immunization Practices (ACIP) makes recommendations to the VFC program as to what are the most appropriate selection of vaccines and related agents for control of vaccine-preventable diseases in the civilian population of the United States. VFC resolutions passed by the ACIP form the basis for VFC program policies on vaccine availability and usage. These resolutions may not necessarily match the general usage recommendations of the ACIP, but rather represent the rules that providers must follow for administering each specific vaccine under the VFC program.

The following vaccines are included in the VFC Program:

- Diphtheria*
- Haemophilus influenzae type b*
- Hepatitis A**
- Hepatitis B*
- Human papillomavirus
- Influenza** (flu)
- Measles*
- Meningococcal
- Mumps*
- Pertussis* (whooping cough)
- Pneumococcal**
- Poliomyelitis*
- Rotavirus**
- Rubella*
- Tetanus*
- Varicella zoster** (chickenpox)

* Vaccines initially targeted by the VFC program in 1994.

** Vaccines added to the VFC program from 1995 to 2013.

== Latest changes ==
The VFC program has implemented several regulations to address the changing needs of grantees:

In attempts to address fraud and abuse, grantees must now submit a copy of the newly written fraud and abuse policy, which includes identification of staff responsible for these issues, to the CDC no later than December 31, 2007.

The VFC program is also requiring the update of user profiles. Rather than having grantees do this task, the goal is to improve accountability and ensure accurate information about the population of eligible children.

A larger and more recent enhancement aiming to improve vaccine management at multiple levels (federal, state, local) is the initiation of the Vaccine Management Business Improvement Project (VMBIP). This project aims to simplify the ordering and distribution projects of vaccines, implement a more efficient supply system, and enable direct delivery of vaccines to providers.
