= Measles vaccine =

Vaccine used to prevent measles

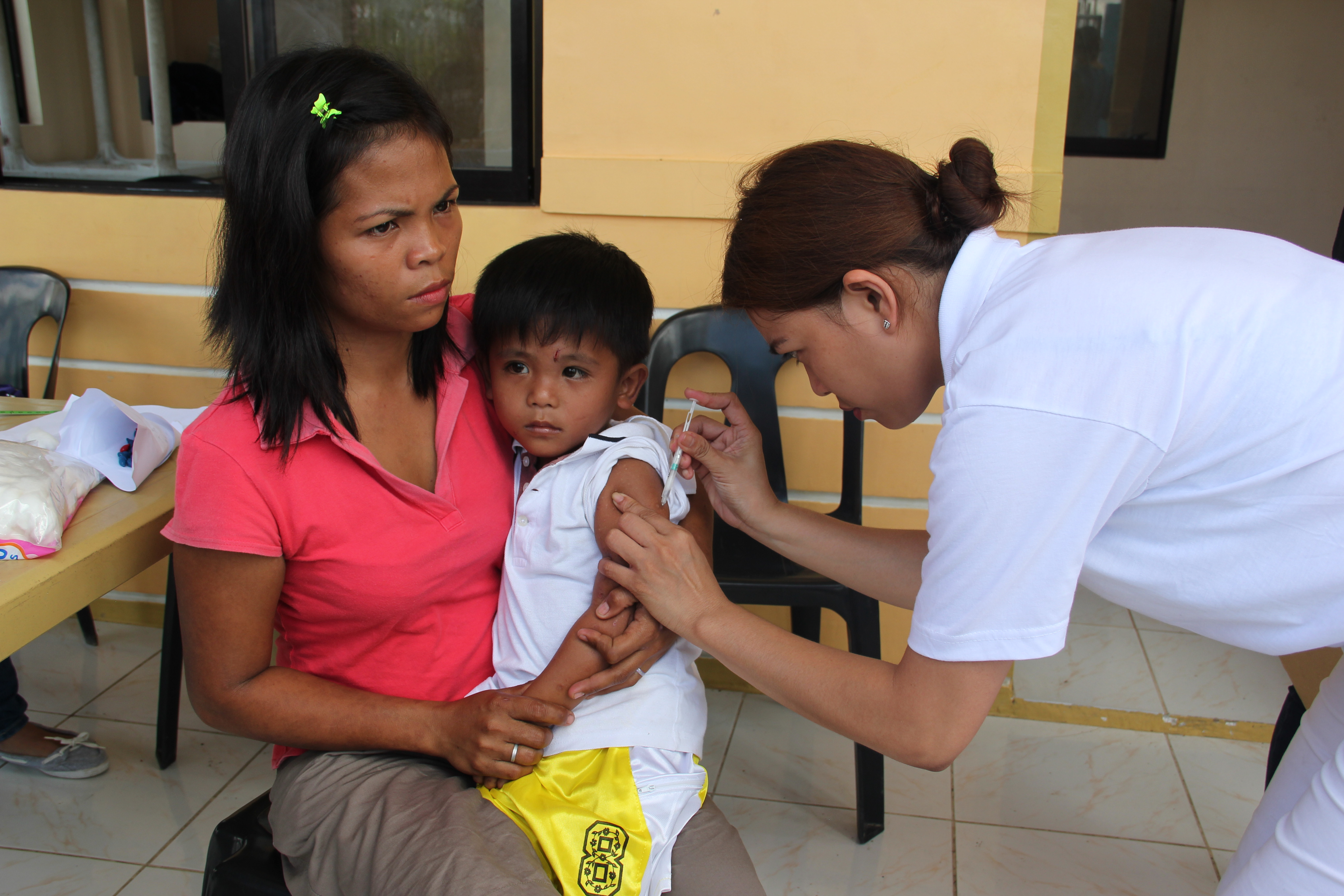
- A child is given a measles vaccine.

Vaccine description
- Target: Measles virus
- Vaccine type: Attenuated

Clinical data
- AHFS/Drugs.com: Monograph
- MedlinePlus: a601176
- ATC code: J07BD01 (WHO)

Legal status
- Legal status: UK: POM (Prescription only); US: ℞-only

Identifiers
- CAS Number: 1704515-59-2
- ChemSpider: none
- KEGG: D04866

Measles vaccine is a live attenuated vaccine that protects against becoming infected with measles. Nearly all of those who do not develop immunity after a single dose develop it after a second dose. When the rate of vaccination within a population is greater than 92%, outbreaks of measles typically no longer occur; however, they may occur again if the rate of vaccination decreases. The vaccine's effectiveness lasts many years. It is unclear if it becomes less effective over time. The vaccine may also protect against measles if given within a couple of days after exposure to measles.

Measles is a highly contagious viral illness that can lead to serious complications, including pneumonia, acute encephalitis, and, in rare cases, long‑term neurological disease. Pregnant women are at increased risk of severe respiratory complications and adverse pregnancy outcomes such as pregnancy loss and premature birth.

The vaccine is generally safe, even for those infected by HIV. Most children do not experience any side effects; those that do occur are usually mild (such as fever, rash, pain at the site of injection, and joint stiffness) and short-lived. Anaphylaxis has been documented in about 3.5–10 cases per million doses. Rates of Guillain–Barré syndrome, autism and inflammatory bowel disease do not appear to be increased by measles vaccination.

The vaccine is available both by itself and in combinations such as the MMR vaccine (a combination with the rubella vaccine and mumps vaccine) or the MMRV vaccine (a combination of MMR with the chickenpox vaccine). The measles vaccine is equally effective for preventing measles in all formulations, but side effects vary for different combinations. The World Health Organization (WHO) recommends measles vaccine be given at nine months of age in areas of the world where the disease is common, or at twelve months where the disease is not common. Measles vaccine is based on a live but weakened strain of measles. It comes as a dried powder that is mixed with a specific liquid before being injected either just under the skin or into a muscle. Verification that the vaccine was effective can be determined by blood tests.

The measles vaccine was first introduced in 1963. In that year, the Edmonston-B strain of measles virus was turned into a vaccine by John Enders and colleagues and licensed in the United States. In 1968, an improved and even weaker measles vaccine was developed by Maurice Hilleman and colleagues, and began to be distributed, becoming the only measles vaccine used in the United States since 1968. About 86% of children globally had received at least one dose of the vaccine as of 2018. In 2021, at least 183 countries provided two doses in their routine immunization schedule. It is on the World Health Organization's List of Essential Medicines. As outbreaks easily occur in under-vaccinated populations, non-prevalence of disease is seen as a test of sufficient vaccination within a population.

== Effectiveness ==
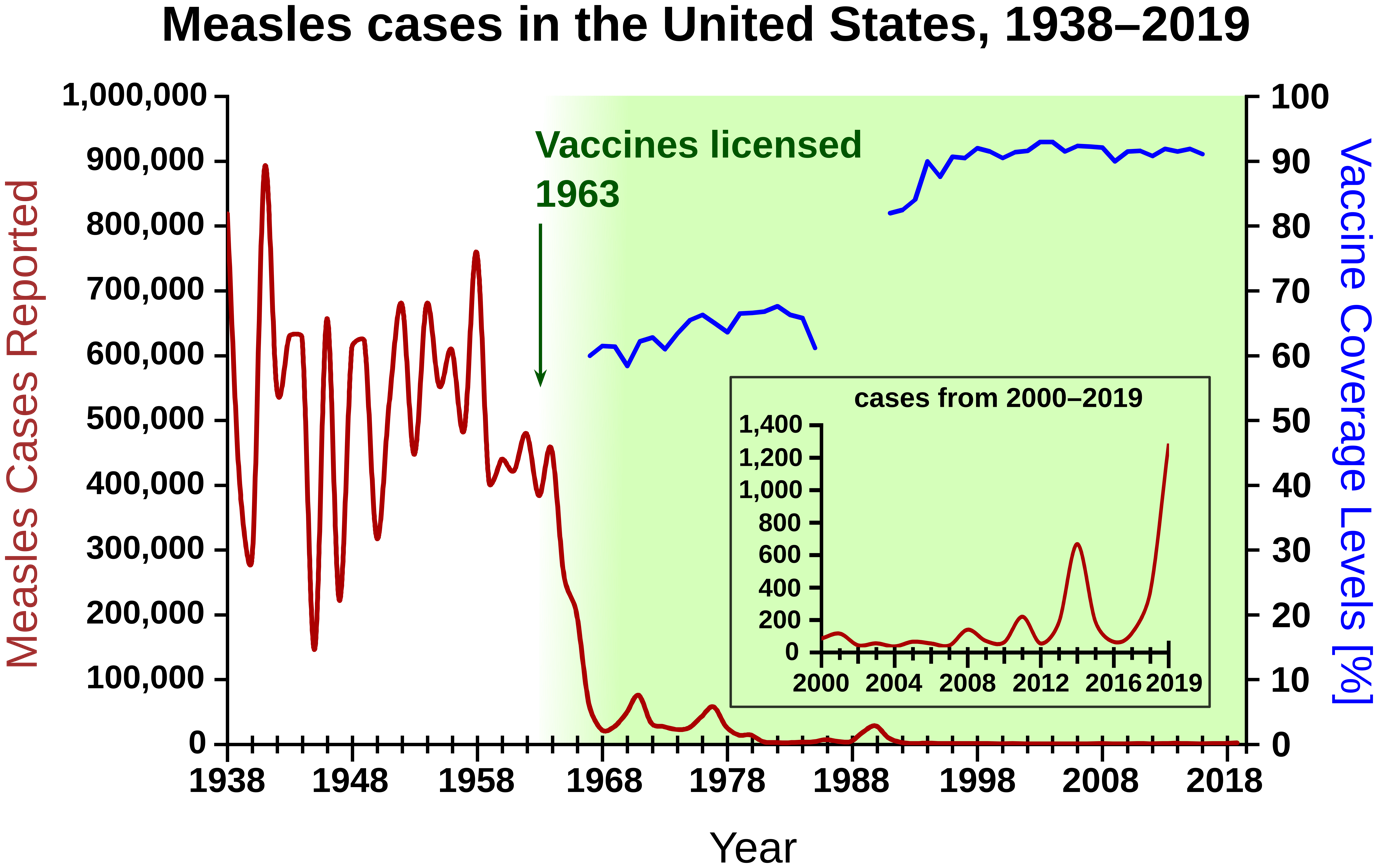
Measles cases reported in the United States before and after the introduction of the vaccine

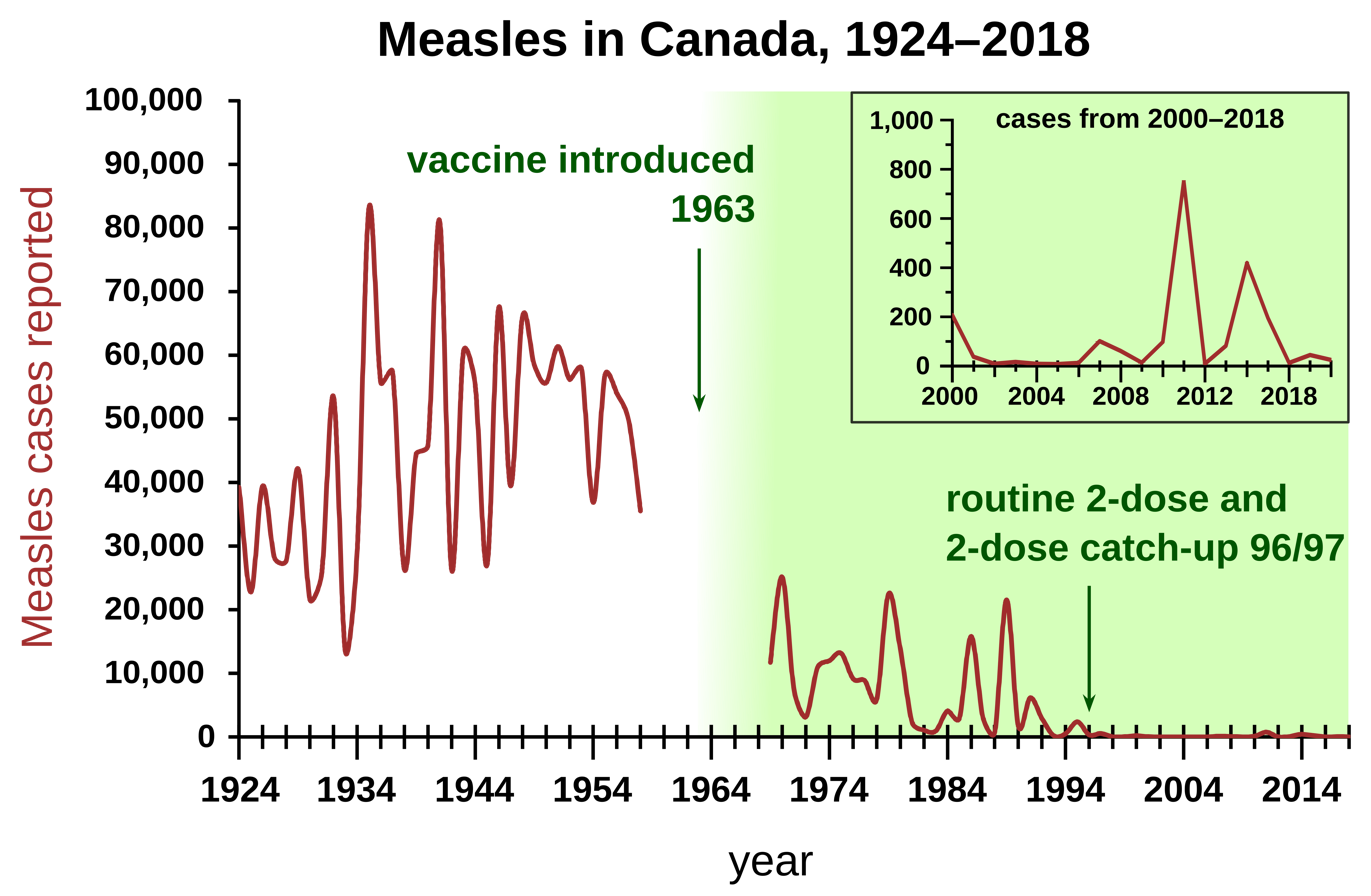
Measles cases reported in Canada before and after introduction of the vaccine. Between 1959 and 1968 measles was not nationally reportable, hence there are no data are this period.

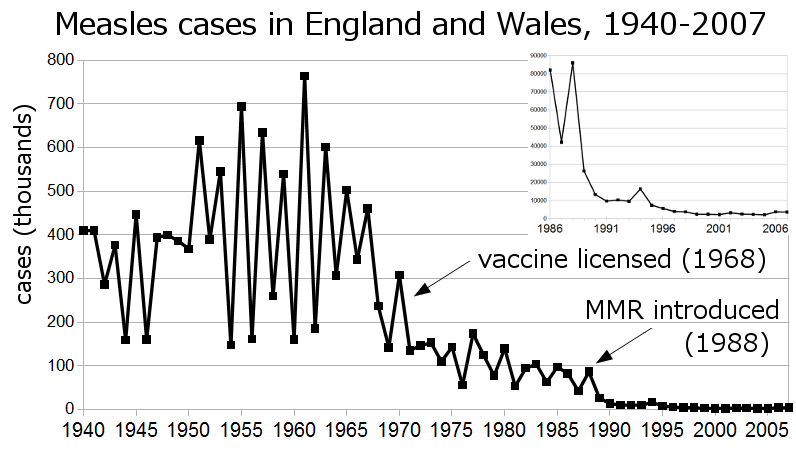
Measles cases reported in England and Wales

One dose is about 93% effective while two doses of the vaccine are about 97% effective at preventing measles. Before the widespread use of the vaccine, measles was so common that infection was considered "as inevitable as death and taxes." In the United States, reported cases of measles fell from 3 to 4 million with 400 to 500 deaths to tens of thousands of cases per year following introduction of two measles vaccines in 1963 (both an inactivated and a live attenuated vaccine (Edmonston B strain) were licensed for use, see chart at right). Increasing uptake of the vaccine following outbreaks in 1971 and 1977 brought this down to thousands of cases per year in the 1980s. An outbreak of almost 30,000 cases in 1990 led to a renewed push for vaccination and the addition of a second vaccine to the recommended schedule. No more than 220 cases were reported in any year from 1997 to 2013, and the disease was believed no longer endemic in the United States. In 2014, 667 cases were reported.

The benefits of measles vaccination in preventing illness, disability, and death have been well documented. Within the first 20 years of being licensed in the U.S., measles vaccination prevented an estimated 52 million cases of the disease, 17,400 cases of intellectual disability, and 5,200 deaths. From 1999 to 2004 a strategy led by the WHO and UNICEF led to improvements in measles vaccination coverage that averted an estimated 1.4 million measles deaths worldwide. The vaccine for measles led to the near-complete elimination of the disease in the United States and other developed countries. While the vaccine is made with a live virus which can cause side effects, these are far fewer and less serious than the sickness and death caused by measles itself; side effects ranging from rashes to, rarely, convulsions, occur in a small percentage of recipients.

Measles vaccination averted 57 million deaths between 2000 and 2022, as per World Health Organization report.

Measles is common worldwide. Although it was declared eliminated from the U.S. in 2000, high rates of vaccination and excellent communication with those who refuse vaccination are needed to prevent outbreaks and sustain the elimination of measles. Of the 66 cases of measles reported in the U.S. in 2005, slightly over half were attributable to one unvaccinated teenager who became infected during a visit to Romania. This individual returned to a community with many unvaccinated children. The resulting outbreak infected 34 people, mostly children and virtually all unvaccinated; three of them were hospitalized. The public health response required making almost 5,000 phone calls as part of contact tracing, arranging and performing testing as needed, and arranging emergency vaccination for at-risk people who had had contact with this person. Taxpayers and local healthcare organizations likely paid more than US$167,000 in direct costs to contain this one outbreak. A major epidemic was averted due to high rates of vaccination in the surrounding communities.

When addressing the major U.S. measles outbreak in 2019, the Centers for Disease Control and Prevention stated that outbreaks are more likely in areas with pockets of unvaccinated residents. However, during the U.S. outbreak beginning in February 2025, the agency declined to publicize their updated expert assessment and forecasting model supporting this conclusion, thereby choosing not to alert clinicians and the public of being at specific risk in areas with low immunization rates.

The vaccine has nonspecific effects such as preventing respiratory infections, that may be greater than those of measles prevention alone. These benefits are greater when the vaccine is given before one year of age. A high-titre vaccine resulted in worse outcomes in girls, and consequently is not recommended by the World Health Organization.

The immune response to the measles vaccine can be impaired by the presence of parasitic infections such as helminthiasis.

=== Schedule ===
Mcv2 vaccine immunization schedule

The World Health Organization (WHO) recommends two doses of vaccine for all children. In countries with a high risk of disease the first dose should be given around nine months of age. Otherwise it can be given at twelve months of age. The second dose should be given at least one month after the first dose. This is often done at age 15 to 18 months. After one dose at the age of nine months 85% are immune, while a dose at twelve months results in 95% immunity.

In the United States, the Centers for Disease Control and Prevention (CDC) recommends that children aged six to eleven months traveling outside the United States receive their first dose of MMR vaccine before departure and then receive two more doses; one at 12–15 months (12 months for children in high-risk areas) and the second as early as four weeks later. Otherwise the first dose is typically given at 12–15 months and the second at 4–6 years.

In the UK, the National Health Service (NHS) recommendation is for a first dose at around 13 months of age and the second at three years and four months old.

Health Canada recommends that children traveling outside North America should receive an MMR vaccine if they are aged six to 12 months. However, after the child is 12 months old they should receive two additional doses to ensure long-lasting protection.

Measles number unvaccinated

Share of children fully vaccinated against measles

== Adverse effects ==
Adverse effects associated with the MMR vaccine include fever, rash, injection site pain, and, in rare cases, red or purple discolorations on the skin known as thrombocytopenic purpura, or seizures related to fever (febrile seizure).

=== False claims about autism ===
In 1998, Andrew Wakefield et al. published a now retracted and fraudulent The Lancet paper linking the MMR vaccine to autism, leading to a decline in vaccination rates. Wakefield was later found to have been "dishonest" by the General Medical Council and barred from practicing medicine in the UK. Numerous subsequent studies and reviews by organizations such as the US Centers for Disease Control and Prevention, Institute of Medicine, NHS and the Cochrane Library have found no evidence of a link between the MMR vaccine and autism. The controversy surrounding Wakefield's publication led to decreased MMR vaccination rates and a subsequent increase in measles cases in the UK. In Japan, where the MMR vaccine is not used as a combined vaccine, autism rates have remained unaffected, further disproving Wakefield's hypothesis.

According to a 2019 Los Angeles Times article, concerns were raised about unvaccinated students contributing to the large number of measles outbreaks.

While Robert F. Kennedy Jr—United States Secretary of Health and Human Services—publicly supported Wakefield's disproven theory that vaccines cause autism, and was the founder of the anti-vaccine Children's Health Defense, on 28 February, during the 2025 Southwest US measles outbreak, he announced that he would be sending 2,000 doses of the MMR vaccine to Texas along with other resources. A New York Times article reporting on the death of a child in Texas from measles—the first in ten years in the United States, said that vaccine hesitancy had been rising for many years.

=== Contraindications ===
Some people shouldn't receive the measles or MMR vaccine, including cases of:

- Pregnancy: MMR vaccine and its components should not be given to pregnant women. Women of childbearing age should check with their doctor about getting vaccinated prior to getting pregnant.
- HIV-infected children, who may receive measles vaccines if their CD4+ lymphocyte count is greater than 15%.
- Weakened immune system due to HIV/AIDS or certain medical treatments
- Having a parent or sibling with a history of immune problems
- Condition that makes a patient bruise or bleed easily
- Recent transfusion of blood or blood products
- Tuberculosis
- Receiving other vaccines in the past 4 weeks
- Moderate or severe illness. However, mild illness (e.g., common cold) is usually not contraindicated.

== History ==
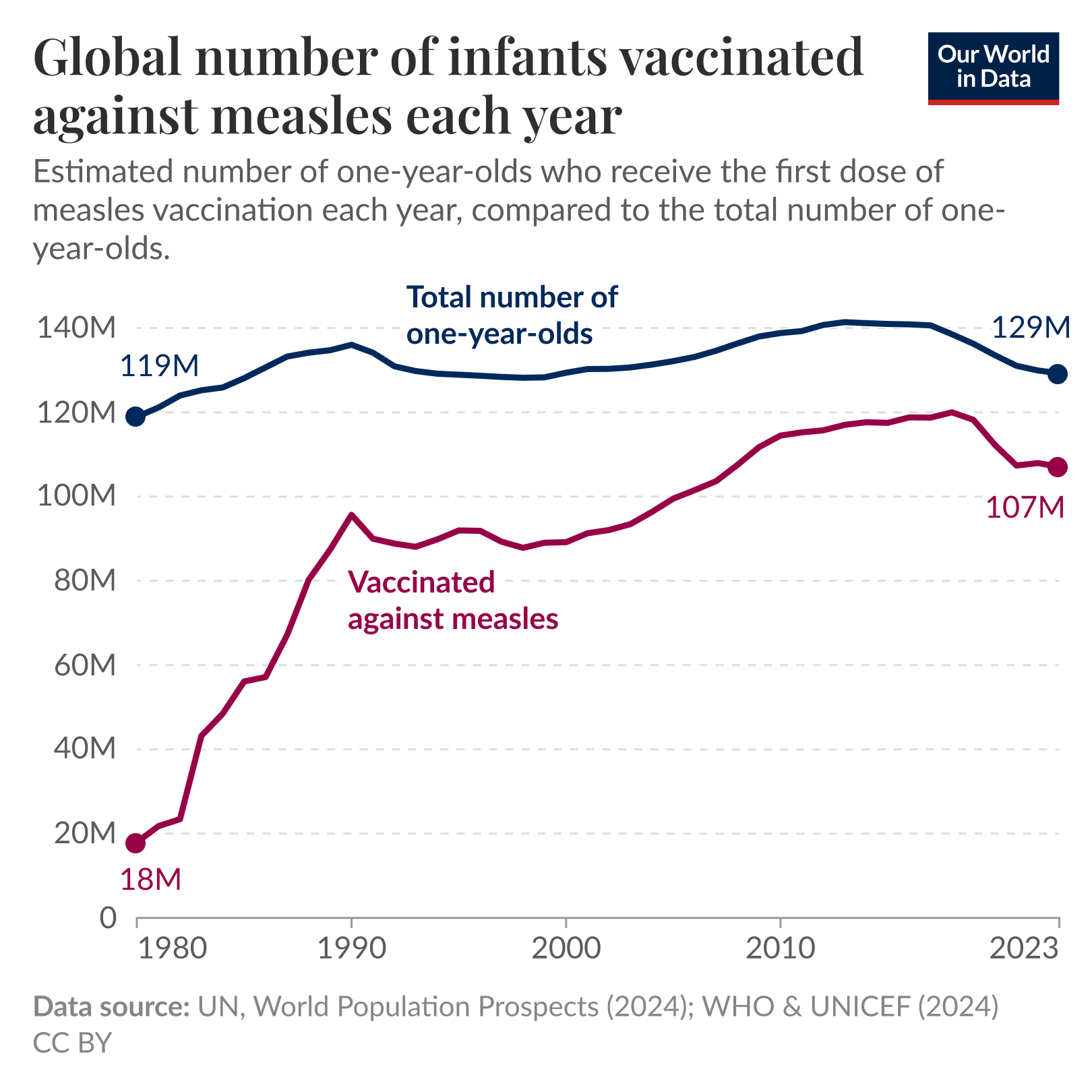
Number of one-year olds who have received measles vaccinations over time

Cases of measles and deaths per 100000, per year, in the United States over the 20th century

John Franklin Enders, who had shared the 1954 Nobel Prize in Medicine for work on the polio virus, sent Thomas C. Peebles to Fay School in Massachusetts, where an outbreak of measles was underway. Peebles was able to isolate the virus from blood samples and throat swabs. He later successfully cultivated the virus and showed that the disease could be passed on to monkeys inoculated with the material he had collected. Enders used the cultivated virus to develop a measles vaccine in 1963 by attenuation through cultured chicken embryo fibroblasts of the material isolated by Peebles.

In the late 1950s and early 1960s, nearly twice as many children died from measles as from polio. The vaccine Enders developed was based on the Edmonston strain of attenuated live measles virus, which was named for 11-year-old David Edmonston, the Fay student from whom Peebles had taken the culture that led to the virus's cultivation.

In the mid-20th century, measles was particularly devastating in West Africa, where child mortality rate was 50 percent before age five, and the children were struck with the type of rash and other symptoms common prior to 1900 in England and other countries. The first trial of a live attenuated measles vaccine was undertaken in 1960 by British paediatrician David Morley in a village near Ilesha, Nigeria; in case he could be accused of exploiting the Nigerian population, Morley included his own four children in the study. The encouraging results led to a second study of about 450 children in the village and at the Wesley Guild Hospital in Ilesha.

Following another epidemic, a larger trial was undertaken in September and October 1962, in New York City with the assistance of the WHO: 131 children received the live Enders-attenuated Edmonston B strain plus gamma globulin, 130 children received a "further attenuated" vaccine without gamma globulin, and 173 children acted as control subjects for both groups. As also shown in the Nigerian trial, the trial confirmed that the "further attenuated" vaccine was superior to the Edmonston B vaccine, and caused significantly fewer instances of fever and diarrhea. 2,000 children in the area were vaccinated with the further-attenuated vaccine.

Maurice Hilleman at Merck & Co., a pioneer in the development of vaccinations, developed an improved version of the measles vaccine in 1968 and subsequently the MMR vaccine in 1971, which vaccinates against measles, mumps and rubella in a single shot followed by a booster. One form is called "Attenuvax". The measles component of the MMR vaccine uses Attenuvax, which is grown in a chick embryo cell culture using the Enders' attenuated Edmonston strain. Following ACIP recommendations, Merck decided not to resume production of Attenuvax as standalone vaccine on 21 October 2009.

A 2022 study in the American Economic Journal found that the measles vaccine uptake led to increases in income of 1.1 percent and positive effects on employment due to greater productivity by those who were vaccinated.

== Types ==
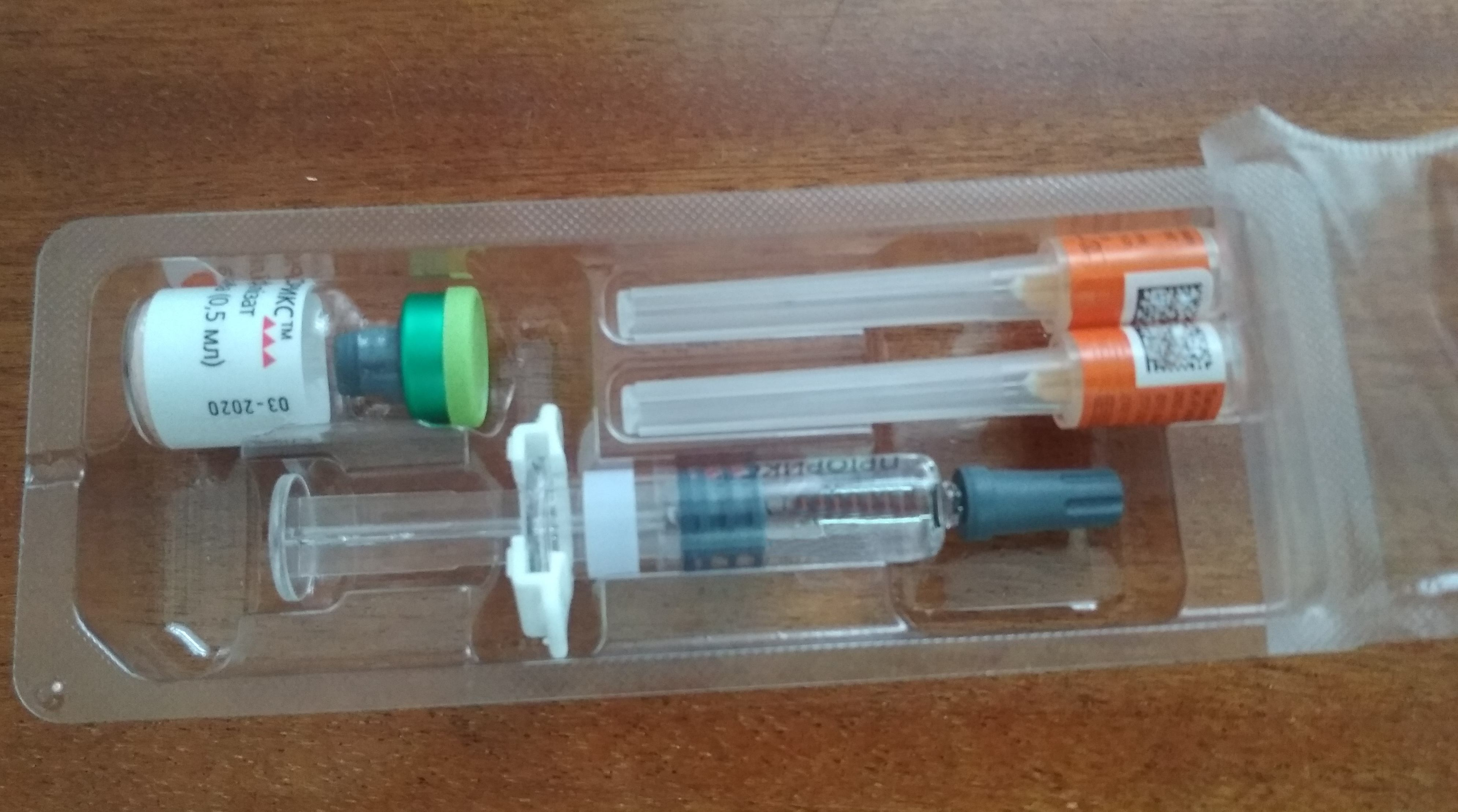
Mumps, measles and rubella combined vaccine (MMR vaccine)

Measles is seldom given as an individual vaccine and is often given in combination with rubella, mumps, or varicella (chickenpox) vaccines. Below is the list of measles-containing vaccines:

- Measles vaccine (standalone vaccine)
- Measles and rubella combined vaccine (MR vaccine)
- Mumps, measles and rubella combined vaccine (MMR vaccine)
- Mumps, measles, rubella and varicella combined vaccine (MMRV vaccine)

== Society and culture ==
Most health insurance plans in the United States cover the cost of vaccines, and Vaccines for Children Program may be able to help those who do not have coverage. State law requires vaccinations for school children, but offer exemptions for medical reasons and sometimes for religious or philosophical reasons. All fifty states require two doses of the MMR vaccine at the appropriate age. A different vaccine distribution within a single territory by age or social class may define different general perceptions of vaccination efficacy.
