= Pregnant women's rights =

Choices and legal rights available to a woman experiencing pregnancy or childbirth

Pregnant patients' rights or Pregnant women's rights refers to the choices and legal rights available to a woman experiencing pregnancy or childbirth. Specifically those under medical care within a medical establishment or those under the care of a medical professional regardless of location ( under care of paramedics at home, family doctor via phone, etc. ).

There are many debates that arise from pregnancy rights, ranging from whether or not fertility treatments are 'right' or whether using surrogate mothers is wrong. It comes down to the mother's right. As a woman, there are more challenges than just the fundamentals of the decisions surrounding their pregnancy. Maternity leave, parental leave and the time allotted for these leaves varies from company to company.

The International Conference on Population and Development (ICPD) gathered in Cairo in September 1994 to discuss and "formulate a consensus position on population and development for the next 20 years". One of the other goals was to make education and medical services available to women while they are pregnant, and when the time comes, have delivery options available. A main concern has always been postnatal care; people think that the hardest part is the birth of the child but there are so many additional concerns once the child is born and brought into this world. Complications both prior to pregnancy, during delivery, and after delivery are a potential concern in all births, the ICPD talked about enhancing the available support for all women. Pregnancy rights throughout the world are not going to be the same in every single place but the ICPD is aiming to eliminate discrimination during pregnancy and make all pregnant patients' rights available to everyone.

Nurses and patients sometimes run into troubles because their opinions will often vary in what they think should be done in terms of termination or pre- and postnatal care. As Kane, 2009 states "The NMC code of professional conduct states that: ‘you must make the care of people your first concern’." Enforcing that the nurses opinions really should be kept to themselves so as to not influence the decision of the patients.

== Rights of pregnant women ==
The rights of pregnant women are defined by a set of recognized rights and protections specified by national laws and international regulations. Here are some of the rights of pregnant women :

1. Right to Access Healthcare: Pregnant women have the right to access necessary healthcare during their pregnancy. This includes regular check-ups and counseling on nutrition and fetal health.
2. Right to Privacy and Confidentiality: The medical information of pregnant women should be treated with confidentiality and privacy, ensuring its security from any leaks.
3. Maternity Leave Rights: Pregnant women have the right to maternity leave with pay, allowing them to rest and care for their infants.
4. Non-Discrimination: Pregnant women should not face discrimination based on their physical condition, whether in the workplace or in daily life.
5. Protection from Harmful Work: Pregnant women must be protected from tasks that could be harmful to their health and the health of the fetus.
6. Breastfeeding Leave Rights: Working women have the right to breastfeeding leave to care for their infants.
7. Right to Choose: Pregnant women have the right to make decisions regarding their pregnancy, including the choice to continue or terminate it.

It's important to consider that the respect and application of these rights can vary from one situation to another and may depend on social and legal contexts. These rights encompass the protection of pregnancy and maternity and the promotion of women's and fetal health.

== By country ==
=== Australia ===
In Australia pregnant women have the same rights as any other member of society. However, they do have some extra rights when it comes to their rights in the workforce.

==== Pregnant women's rights in the workforce ====
Under the Fair Work Act 2009 section pregnant women are still entitled to the same amount of sick leave as any other individual as being pregnant does not classify as an illness. A Pregnant woman however is able to take unpaid leave for "special maternity leave", this is maternity leave that she can take if she has a pregnancy related illness or the pregnancy ends any time after the first trimester due to a miscarriage, a stillbirth or a termination.

Safe jobs is when the women moves to a safer job while being because her original job is dangerous to her and the baby. She will need to provide evidence that she can still work but unable to perform the original tasks and how long she shouldn't work in her job for. An example for proving these would be with a medical certificate. In the circumstances where there is no safer jobs to offer the women can take no safe jobs leave. The employee takes paid leave if she is entitled to unpaid parental leave and unpaid leave if she is not.

Discrimination in the workforce against pregnant women is illegal. This means that she can not be fired, lose hours, demoted and treated differently because of her pregnancy.

==== Terminating the pregnancy ====
In Australia the laws on termination change between each state and territory. In Western Australia, termination is considered lawful up until 20 weeks of pregnancy. A termination after 20 weeks can only be undertaken if there is two medical practitioners from a panel of six that agree that the women or the fetus has or will have a serious medical condition if the pregnancy continued.

==== Immunisation ====
During pregnancy, women have the right to seek getting immunised with the influenza vaccine ("Flu Shot") and the adult dTpa vaccine (pertussis). Both of these vaccines are recommended; however, it is up to the individual whether or not to go ahead with the vaccinations.

== Islam and abortion rights ==
In Islamic jurisprudence, abortion is generally considered forbidden (haram) unless there is a threat to the life of the mother. However, there is a difference of opinion among religious scholars regarding the circumstances under which abortion may be considered permissible. Some scholars view abortion as permissible if there is a threat to the mother's health, if the pregnancy is a result of rape, or if it is determined that the fetus is suffering from severe abnormalities. Nevertheless, there is a general consensus among scholars that abortion for non-essential, material, or social reasons is not permissible.

Fatwas and legal rulings concerning abortion are a sensitive issue and depend on individual and surrounding circumstances. Some countries allow abortion under certain circumstances under civil and medical laws regulated by the state.

== Immunisation of pregnant women and ethics ==
Immunising pregnant women presents specific ethical considerations due to the need to protect both the health of the mother and that of the fetus.

Risk and Benefit Assessment: Before administering vaccines to a pregnant woman, it is crucial to carefully assess the potential risks to both the mother and the fetus in relation to the benefits of vaccination. The decision should be based on strong scientific evidence and thorough ethical evaluation.

Informed Consent: Obtaining informed consent from the pregnant woman before proceeding with immunisation is imperative. This involves providing clear information about potential benefits, possible risks, and available alternatives, so she can make an informed decision.

Safety and Efficacy: Vaccines administered to pregnant women should be pre-tested for safety and efficacy during pregnancy. It is essential to have robust scientific data to ensure that the benefits for the mother and the fetus outweigh any potential risks.

Communication and Transparency: Clear and transparent communication about the benefits, risks, and uncertainties associated with immunisation during pregnancy is essential to build trust and facilitate informed decision-making. Information should be provided in an understandable and culturally sensitive manner.

Management of Adverse Effects: Having appropriate protocols for monitoring potential adverse effects of vaccines administered to pregnant women is important. Establishing mechanisms for monitoring and providing adequate care is essential to ensure the safety and well-being of pregnant women and their fetuses.

Immunising pregnant women, therefore, requires a thorough ethical assessment that considers safety, efficacy, transparent communication, and informed consent. It is crucial to adopt a balanced approach that ensures the protection of maternal health while minimising risks to the fetus.

== See also ==
Pregnant Workers Fairness Act
