= Jeryl Lynn =

Strain of mumps virus vaccination

Jeryl Lynn are strains of mumps virus used in the Mumpsvax mumps vaccine made by Merck. The strains are named after Jeryl Lynn Hilleman. In 1963, Jeryl's father, Maurice Hilleman, was leading efforts to produce a mumps vaccine for Merck. He cultured the mumps virus from her throat, and in 1967 a vaccine was produced which is now widely used.

The Jeryl Lynn strains used in the manufacture of Mumpsvax later turned out to contain two distinguishable viral substrains, JL1 and JL2. Further research showed that the JL1 strain was preferentially selected by propagation in Vero and chick embryo fibroblast (CEF) cell cultures. The JL2 strain was preferentially selected by passage in embryonated chicken eggs.

In the US, the Jeryl Lynn strain-based vaccines supplanted the previous, killed virus, vaccine in 1978.

== See also ==
- MMR vaccine
