= Immunization during pregnancy =

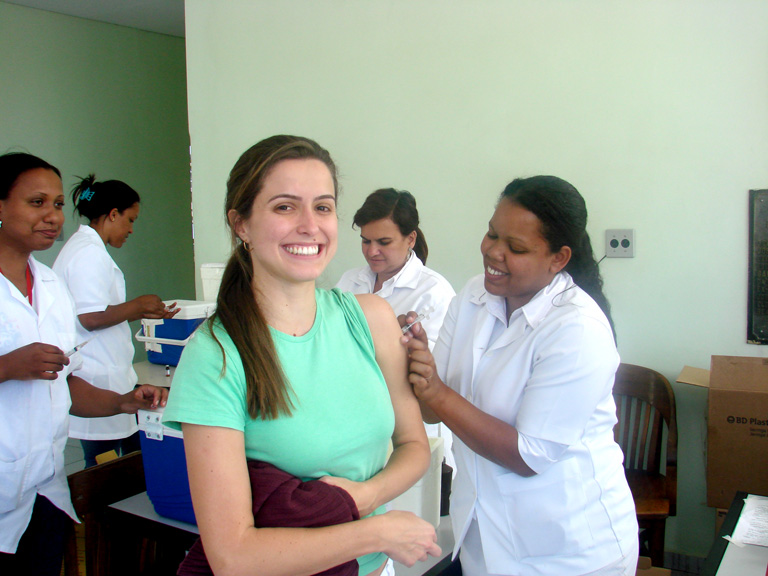

Immunization during pregnancy is the administration of a vaccine to a pregnant individual. This may be done either to protect the individual from disease or to induce an antibody response, such that the antibodies cross the placenta and provide passive immunity to the infant after birth. In many countries, including the US, Canada, UK, Australia and New Zealand, vaccination against influenza and whooping cough is routinely offered during pregnancy. During the COVID-19 pandemic, almost all countries offered COVD-19 vaccines to pregnant individuals, but in the post-pandemic era some countries, including the UK, stopped offering COVID-19 vaccines on cost-benefit grounds. A new vaccine against respiratory syncytial virus has recently been developed for use in pregnancy and is offered in countries including the US, Canada, UK, Australia and Argentina.

Other vaccines may be offered during pregnancy where travel-related or occupational exposure to disease-causing organisms warrant this. However, certain vaccines are contra-indicated in pregnancy. These include vaccines that include live attenuated organisms, such as the MMR and BCG vaccines, since there is a potential risk that these could infect the fetus.

== Tetanus and whooping cough vaccination in pregnancy ==
Newborns are at increased risk of infection, particularly before they receive their first infant vaccinations. For this reason, certain vaccinations are offered during pregnancy in order to induce an antibody response, resulting in the passage of antibody across the placenta and into the fetus: this confers passive immunity on the newborn. As early as 1879, it was noted that infants born following smallpox vaccination in pregnancy were themselves protected against smallpox. However, the original smallpox vaccination was never widely used during pregnancy because, as a live vaccine, its use is contraindicated.

Tetanus is a bacterial infection caused by Clostridium tetani. Newborns can be infected via their unhealed umbilical stump, particularly when the umbilical cord is cut with a non-sterile instrument, and suffer a generalised infection. The tetanus toxoid vaccine was first licensed for use in 1938 and, during the 1960s, it was noted that tetanus vaccination in pregnancy could prevent neonatal tetanus. Subsequent trials showed that vaccination of pregnant women reduces infant deaths from tetanus by 94%. In 1988, the World Health Assembly passed a resolution to use maternal vaccination to eliminate neonatal tetanus by the year 2000. Although neonatal tetanus has not yet been eliminated, by 2017 there were an estimated 31,000 annual infant deaths from tetanus, down from 787,000 in 1987.

Whooping cough, or pertussis, is a contagious respiratory disease caused by the bacteria Bordetella pertussis. It is fatal in an estimated 0.5% of infants in the USA. The first vaccine against whooping cough was developed in the 1930s, and in the 1940s a study found that vaccination in pregnancy protected infants against developing whooping cough.

A pertussis‑containing booster is recommended during pregnancy to protect infants in the first months of life. Worldwide, DPT vaccine (also written DTP) refers to the infant combination vaccine used in routine childhood schedules (formulated as acellular DTaP or whole‑cell DTwP), whereas the reduced‑antigen acellular booster Tdap (also known as dTpa) is indicated for adolescents and adults and is recommended during pregnancy in many countries to protect young infants.

The tetanus and whooping cough vaccinations are generally administered in combination during pregnancy, for example as the DTaP vaccine (which also protects against diphtheria) or the 4-in-1 vaccine (which also protects against diphtheria and polio).

== Influenza vaccination in pregnancy ==
Influenza is a respiratory infection caused by influenza viruses. Pregnant women are disproportionately affected by influenza: in the 1918 pandemic, mortality rates as high as 27% were reported in this population and in the 1957 pandemic, nearly 20% of deaths in pregnancy were attributed to influenza. In the 2009 pandemic, even with medical advances, pregnant women accounted for a disproportionately high percentage of deaths.

The influenza vaccine was first used in the US military from 1938, and then in the civilian population from the 1940s. Given the increased risk of influenza during pregnancy, public health bodies in the USA recommended that pregnant women should be prioritised for influenza vaccination from the 1960s, with the CDC endorsing the recommendation from 1997. However, it was not until 2005 that a randomised clinical trial formally demonstrated the efficacy of influenza vaccination in pregnancy.

Following the 2009 pandemic, both Australia and the UK added influenza vaccination to the recommended schedule for pregnant women.

== COVID-19 vaccination in pregnancy ==
COVID-19 is a respiratory infection caused by the SARS-CoV2 virus. Before COVID-19 vaccines were available, pregnant women who caught the disease were at increased risk of needing intensive care, invasive ventilation or ECMO, but not at increased risk of death. Infection significantly increased the risk of preterm birth, stillbirth and pre-eclampsia.

COVID-19 vaccination during pregnancy is safe and associated with improved levels of risk for stillbirth, premature birth and admission of the newborn to intensive care. Vaccination can prevent COVID-19 infection during pregnancy although these immunity benefits are not passed on to the child.

mRNA COVID-19 vaccines were first rolled out in December 2020. At this time, in recognition of the risks posed by COVID-19 disease in pregnancy, the US and Israel offered the vaccines to all pregnant women shortly afterwards, and the first safety and effectiveness data therefore came from these vaccines and these nations.

== RSV vaccination in pregnancy ==
Respiratory syncytial virus is a virus that causes infections of the respiratory tract, and is the leading cause of bronchiolitis and pneumonia in infants and children under the age of 5. An RSV prefusion F (RSV pre-F) protein vaccine, Abrysvo, was approved in the US in May 2023 for use in pregnant individuals. In clinical trials, the vaccine was 81.8% effective against severe RSV in infants under 90 days and 69.4% in those under 180 days. Alternatively, a long-acting monoclonal antibody (nirsevimab or clesrovimab) may be administered shortly before or after birth in the RSV season; most infants require one strategy, not both. The first countries to implement programmes of RSV vaccination in pregnancy were the US and Argentina, and it is now being more widely implemented, including in Canada, the UK, and Australia.

== Rubella vaccination to prevent fetal disease ==
Rubella, or German measles, is an infection caused by the rubella virus. In childhood, it usually causes a mild disease but infection in pregnancy can result in fetal infection, or congenital rubella syndrome, which causes neonatal deaths, deafness, blindness and intellectual disabilities. The first rubella vaccine was licensed for use in 1969, with its development largely spurred by the heavy burden of congenital rubella experienced in the 1960s.

Because the rubella vaccine is a live attenuated vaccine, there is a theoretical risk that it could cause fetal infection, although this has never been seen to occur. Therefore, rubella vaccination is usually avoided during pregnancy. Rather, vaccination is offered to children to reduce the prevalence of rubella virus in circulation and/or to adolescent girls, to boost their immunity before they are likely to conceive.
