= Michiaki Takahashi =

Japanese virologist (1928–2013)

- Born: February 17, 1928; Yuzato, Higashisumiyoshi-ku, Osaka, Japan
- Died: December 16, 2013 (aged 85); Suita, Osaka Prefecture, Japan
- Education: Osaka University; Baylor College of Medicine; Temple University
- Occupation: Virologist
- Medical career
- Field: Medicine
- Institutions: Research Institute for Microbial Diseases, Osaka University
- Sub-specialties: Virology
- Research: Chickenpox
- Notable works: Varicella vaccine

Michiaki Takahashi (高橋 理明, Takahashi Michiaki; February 17, 1928 – December 16, 2013) was a Japanese virologist, best known for inventing the first chickenpox vaccine. He developed the "Oka" vaccine by producing v-Oka, a live-attenuated virus strain of varicella zoster virus.

== Life ==
Born at Higashisumiyoshi-ku, Osaka, Japan, on February 17, 1928, Takahashi earned his MD in 1954 from Osaka University's Medical School, and completed in 1959 the Graduate Course of Medical Science, majoring in poxvirus virology.

Between 1963 and 1965 he studied at Baylor College of Medicine in Texas, and at the Fels Research Institute of Temple University, in Philadelphia.

The experience of watching his eldest son, Teruyuki, suffer from chickenpox while studying in the U.S. led him to begin development of a chickenpox vaccine in 1971. The research was extremely difficult, but was completed in 1973. In 1984, the vaccine was certified by the WHO as the most suitable chickenpox vaccine, and in 1986, the Japanese Ministry of Health and Welfare approved it for practical use in countries around the world.

Takahashi became the director of Osaka University's Microbial Disease Study Group in 1994. After retirement from Osaka University, he was given the title professor emeritus.

He died on December 16, 2013, from heart failure.

== Awards ==
- Saburo Kojima Memorial Culture Award (1975)
- VZVRF's third Scientific Achievement Award (1997)
- Prince Mahidol Award (2008)

== Legacy ==
The Japanese Society for Vaccinology presents an annual prize named in Takahashi's honor: The Japanese Society for Vaccinology Takahashi Prize, founded in October 2005.

On 17 February 2022, Takahashi was honoured with a Google Doodle on his 94th birthday.
