= Antigenic drift =

Genetic variation in viruses of mutations in virus genes that code virus proteins

Antigenic drift is a kind of genetic variation in viruses, arising from the accumulation of mutations in the virus genes that code for virus-surface proteins that host antibodies recognize. This results in a new strain of virus particles that is not effectively inhibited by the antibodies that prevented infection by previous strains. This makes it easier for the changed virus to spread throughout a partially immune population. Antigenic drift occurs in both influenza A and influenza B viruses.

(Confusion can arise with two very similar terms, antigenic shift and genetic drift. Antigenic shift is a closely related process; it refers to the more dramatic changes in the virus's surface proteins when the genetic material from two or more viruses mix together. Genetic drift is very different and much more broadly applicable; it refers to the gradual accumulation in any DNA sequence of random mutational changes that do not interfere with the DNA's function and thus that are not seen by natural selection.)

The immune system recognizes viruses when antigens on the surfaces of virus particles bind to immune receptors that are specific for these antigens. These receptors can be antibodies in the bloodstream or similar proteins on the surfaces of immune-system cells. This recognition is quite precise, like a key recognizing a lock. After an infection or after vaccination, the body produces many more of these virus-specific immune receptors, which prevent re-infection by this particular strain of the virus; this is called acquired immunity. However, viral genomes are constantly mutating, producing new forms of these antigens. If one of these new forms of an antigen is sufficiently different from the old antigen, it will no longer bind to the antibodies or immune-cell receptors, allowing the mutant virus to infect people who were immune to the original strain of the virus because of prior infection or vaccination.

In 1940s, Maurice Hilleman discovered antigenic drift, which is the most common way that influenza viruses change. A second type of change is antigenic shift, also discovered by Hilleman, where the virus acquires a completely new version of one of its surface-protein genes from a distantly related influenza virus. The rate of antigenic drift is dependent on two characteristics: the duration of the epidemic, and the strength of host immunity. A longer epidemic allows for selection pressure to continue over an extended period of time and stronger host immune responses increase selection pressure for development of novel antigens.

== In influenza viruses ==
In the influenza virus, the two relevant antigens are the surface proteins, hemagglutinin and neuraminidase. The hemagglutinin is responsible for binding and entry into host epithelial cells while the neuraminidase is involved in the process of new virions budding out of host cells. Sites recognized on the hemagglutinin and neuraminidase proteins by host immune systems are under constant selective pressure. Antigenic drift allows for evasion of these host immune systems by small mutations in the hemagglutinin and neuraminidase genes that make the protein unrecognizable to pre-existing host immunity. Antigenic drift is this continuous process of genetic and antigenic change among flu strains.

In human populations, immune (vaccinated) individuals exert selective pressure for single point mutations in the hemagglutinin gene that increase receptor binding avidity, while naive individuals exert selective pressure for single point mutations that decrease receptor binding avidity. These dynamic selection pressures facilitate the observed rapid evolution in the hemagglutinin gene. Specifically, 18 specific codons in the HA1 domain of the hemagglutinin gene have been identified as undergoing positive selection to change their encoded amino acid. To meet the challenge of antigenic drift, vaccines that confer broad protection against heterovariant strains are needed against seasonal, epidemic and pandemic influenza.

As in all RNA viruses, mutations in influenza occur frequently because the virus' RNA polymerase has no proofreading mechanism, resulting in an error rate between 1×10^{−3} and 8×10^{−3} substitutions per site per year during viral genome replication. Mutations in the surface proteins allow the virus to elude some host immunity, and the numbers and locations of these mutations that confer the greatest amount of immune escape has been an important topic of study for over a decade.

== See also ==
- Antigenic shift
- Original antigenic sin
