= Mumps vaccine =

Vaccine which prevents mumps

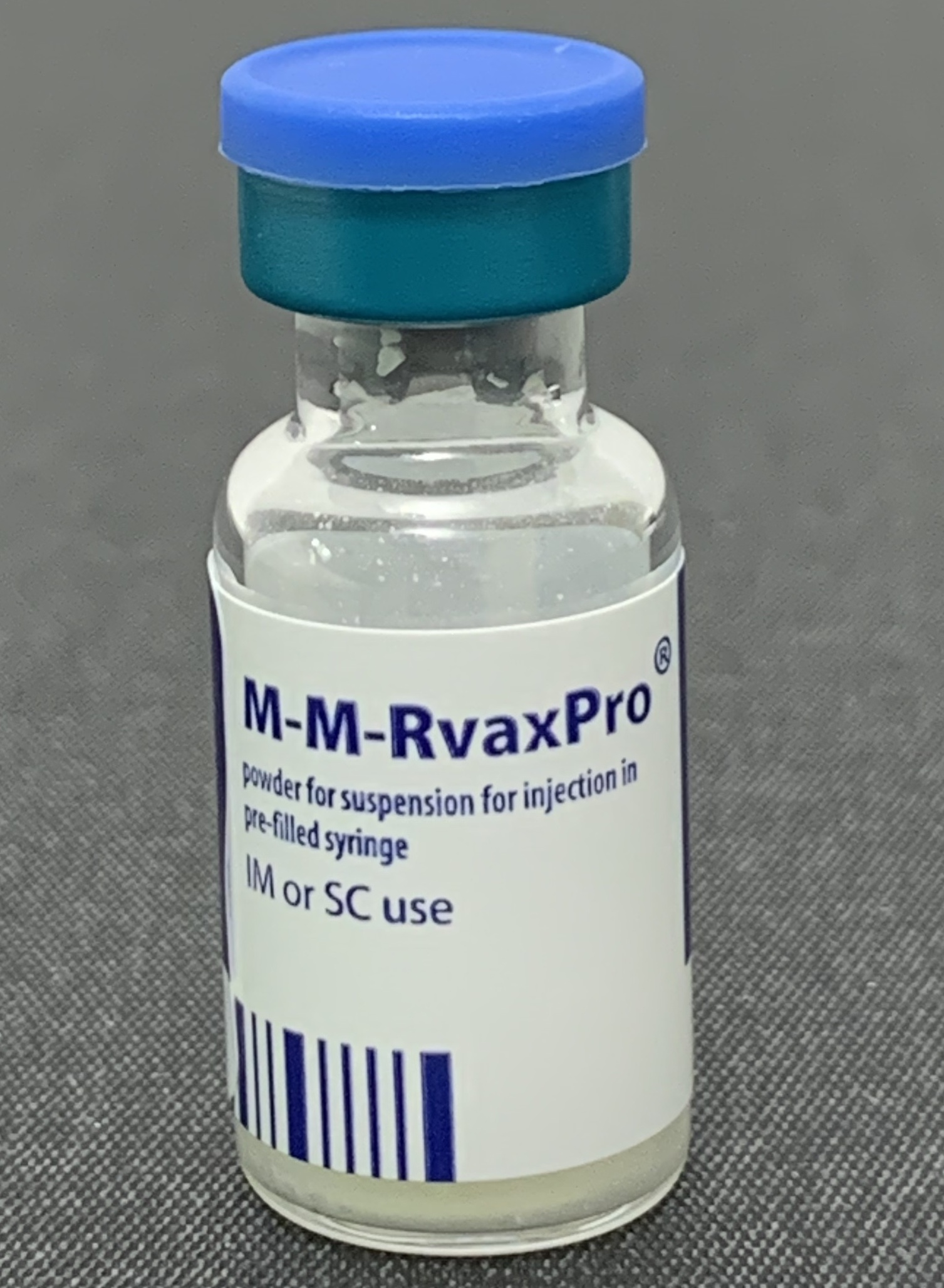
- MMR vaccine contains protection against mumps

Vaccine description
- Target: Mumps
- Vaccine type: Attenuated

Clinical data
- MedlinePlus: a601176
- ATC code: J07BE01 (WHO)

Identifiers
- ChemSpider: none
- UNII: 47QB6MX9KU

Mumps vaccines are vaccines which prevent mumps. When given to a majority of the population they decrease complications at the population level. Effectiveness when 90% of a population is vaccinated is estimated at 85%. Two doses are required for long term prevention. The initial dose is recommended between 12 and 18 months of age. The second dose is then typically given between two years and six years of age. Usage after exposure in those not already immune may be useful.

Side effects are usually mild. It may cause "slight soreness and swelling" at the site of injection, parotisis and mild fever. More significant side effects are rare. Evidence is insufficient to link the vaccine to complications such as neurological effects (beyond "occasional orchitis and sensorineural deafness"). The vaccine should not be given to people who are pregnant or have very poor immune system function. Poor outcomes among children of mothers who received the vaccine during pregnancy, however, have not been documented. Even though the vaccine is developed in chicken cells, it is generally safe to give to those with egg allergies.

Most of the developed world and many countries in the developing world include it in their immunization programs often in combination with measles and rubella vaccine known as MMR. A formulation with the previous three and the varicella (chickenpox) vaccine known as MMRV is also available. As of 2005, 110 countries provided the vaccine as part of their immunization programs. In areas where widespread vaccination is carried out it has resulted in a more than 90% decline in rates of disease. Almost half a billion doses of one variety of the vaccine has been given.

== History ==
Mumps vaccine immunization schedule

In the mid-twentieth century, mumps infections among children were not viewed as a serious public health issue, but adult men may develop debilitating testicular inflammation, which posed particular difficulty among close-quartered soldiers during wartime. As a result, during World War II (1939–1945), the United States government targeted mumps for scientific research. The first experimental mumps vaccine was licensed in 1948; developed from inactivated virus, it only had short-term effectiveness.

Improved vaccines became commercially available in the 1960s. In 1963, Maurice Hilleman of Merck & Co. took samples of the mumps virus from his daughter, who had contracted the disease; she became the namesake for the resulting Jeryl Lynn strain. Building on then-recent advances that had led to vaccines for polio and measles, the mumps virus strains were developed in embryonic hens' eggs and chick embryo cell cultures. The resulting strains of virus were less well-suited for human cells, and are thus said to be attenuated. They are sometimes referred to as neuroattenuated in the sense that these strains are less virulent to human neurons than the wild strains.

Hilleman's work led to the first effective mumps vaccine, called Mumpsvax. Licensed in 1967, its four-year development set a record for fastest development of a new vaccine, a record later surpassed by the COVID-19 vaccine, which was developed in less than a year.

Vaccination against mumps did not become routine until Mumpsvax was included in Merck's combined MMR vaccine, which targeted measles and rubella along with mumps. MMR was licensed in 1971, and 40 percent of American children had received the combined vaccine by 1974. In 1977, the U.S. Centers for Disease Control and Prevention (CDC) recommended mumps immunization (as part of MMR) for all children over 12 months of age, and in 1998, CDC began recommending a two-dose immunization of MMR.

== Types ==
While the initial vaccine in the 1940s was based on inactivated virus, subsequent preparations since the 1960s consist of live virus that has been weakened. It is on the World Health Organization's List of Essential Medicines. There are a number of different types in use as of 2007.

Mumpsvax is Merck's brand of Jeryl Lynn strain vaccines. It is a component of Merck's three-virus MMR vaccine, and is the mumps vaccine standard in the United States. Mumpsvax is given by a subcutaneous injection of live virus reconstituted from freeze-dried (lyophilized) vaccine. Production of Mumpsvax as a stand-alone product ceased in 2009.

The cells used in culture, virus stocks used, and animal fluids are all screened for extraneous material as part of the vaccine production. They are grown in Medium 199 (a solution containing buffered salt, vitamins, amino acids, fetal bovine serum) with SPGA (sucrose, phosphate, glutamate, human serum albumin) and neomycin. The human albumin processing uses the Cohn cold ethanol fractionation method.

=== Other types ===
- RIT 4385 is a newer strain derived from the Jeryl Lynn strain by Maurice Hilleman, Jeryl Lynn's father.
- Leningrad-3 strain was developed by Smrodintsev and Klyachko in guinea pig kidney cell culture and has been used since 1950 in former Soviet countries. This vaccine is routinely used in Russia.
- L-Zagreb strain used in Croatia and India was derived from the Leningrad-3 strain by further passaging.
- Urabe strain was introduced in Japan, and later licensed in Belgium, France and Italy. It has been associated with a higher incidence of meningitis (1/143 000 versus 1/227 000 for J-L), and abandoned in several countries. It was formulated as MMR in the UK.
- Rubini strain used mainly in Switzerland was attenuated by a higher number of passes through chicken embryos, and later proved to have low potency. It was introduced in 1985.

== Illegal importation of ineffective version into the UK ==
Monovalent mumps vaccine (Mumpsvax) remained available in the US when MMR was introduced in the UK, replacing the MR (measles and rubella) mixed vaccine. No UK-licensed monovalent preparation was ever available. Monovalent mumps vaccines were available before MMR, but only used on a limited scale. This became the subject of considerable argument at the end of the 20th century, since some parents preferred to obtain individually the components of the MMR mixture. One unlicensed mumps vaccine preparation imported into the United Kingdom proved to be essentially ineffective. Immunisation against mumps in the UK became routine in 1988, commencing with MMR. The Aventis-Pasteur "MMR-2" brand is usual in the UK in 2006.

== Storage and stability ==
The cold chain is a major consideration in vaccination, particularly in less-developed countries. Mumps vaccines are normally refrigerated, but have a long half-life of 65 days at 23 degrees Celsius.
