= Varicella vaccine =

Vaccine to prevent chickenpox

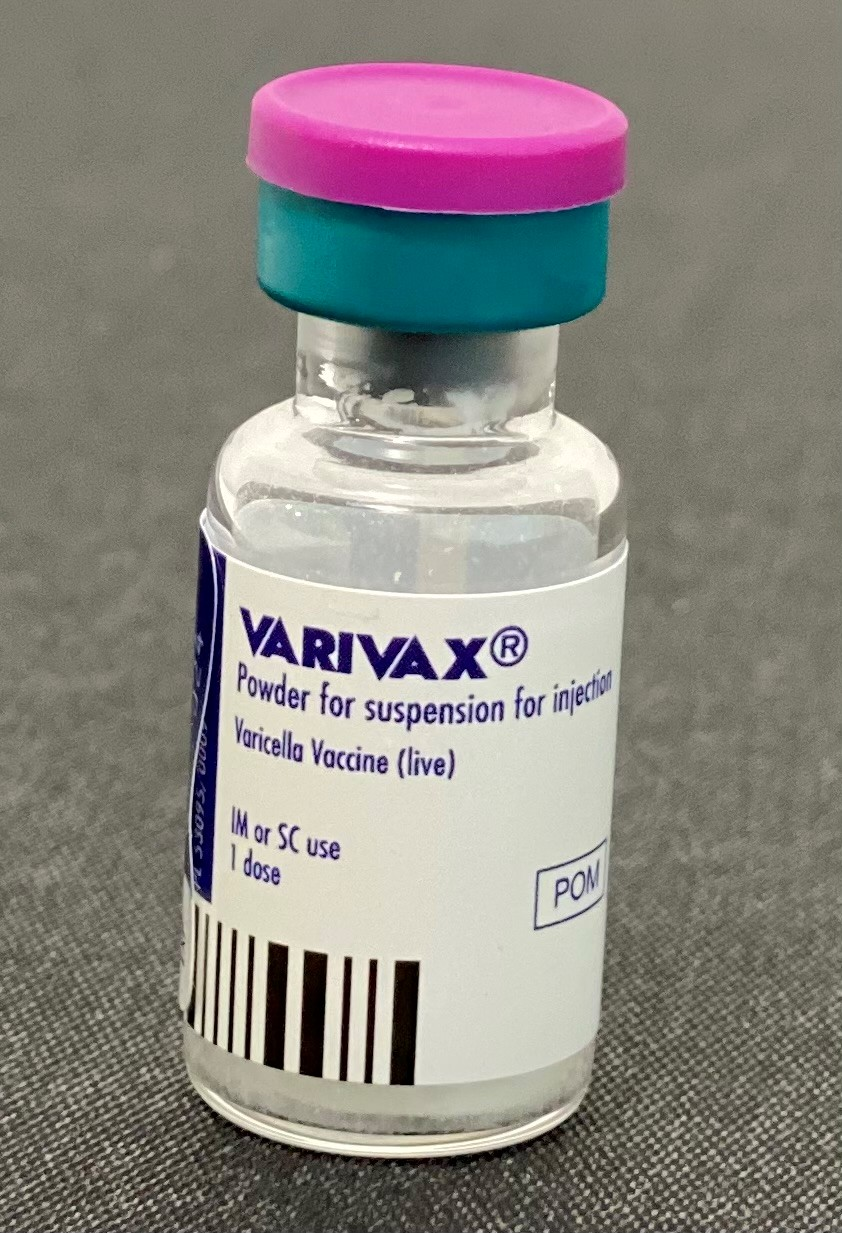
- Varicella vaccine

Vaccine description
- Target: Varicella
- Vaccine type: Attenuated

Clinical data
- Trade names: Varivax, Varilrix, others
- AHFS/Drugs.com: Monograph
- MedlinePlus: a607029
- Pregnancy category: AU: B2
- Routes of administration: subcutaneous
- ATC code: J07BK01 (WHO) J07BK02 (WHO) J07BK03 (WHO)

Legal status
- Legal status: AU: S4 (Prescription only); UK: POM (Prescription only); US: ℞-only; EU: Rx-only; In general: ℞ (Prescription only)

Identifiers
- CAS Number: 934490-96-7
- DrugBank: DB10318
- ChemSpider: none
- UNII: GPV39ZGD8C

Varicella vaccine, also known as chickenpox vaccine, is a vaccine that protects against chickenpox. One dose of vaccine prevents 95% of moderate disease and 100% of severe disease. Two doses of vaccine are more effective than one. If given to those who are not immune within five days of exposure to chickenpox it prevents most cases of the disease. Vaccinating a large portion of the population also protects those who are not vaccinated. It is given by injection just under the skin. Another vaccine, known as zoster vaccine, is used to prevent diseases caused by the same virus – the varicella zoster virus.

The World Health Organization (WHO) recommends routine vaccination only if a country can keep more than 80% of people vaccinated. If only 20% to 80% of people are vaccinated it is possible that more people will get the disease at an older age and outcomes overall may worsen. Either one or two doses of the vaccine are recommended. In the United States two doses are recommended starting at twelve to fifteen months of age. As of 2017, twenty-three countries recommend all non-medically exempt children receive the vaccine, nine recommend it only for high-risk groups, three additional countries recommend use in only parts of the country, while other countries make no recommendation. Not all countries provide the vaccine due to its cost. In the United Kingdom, the varicella vaccine has been added in 2026 to the routine children vaccination, combined with the MMR vaccine, at ages 12 and 18 months.

Minor side effects may include pain at the site of injection, fever, and rash. Severe side effects are rare and occur mostly in those with poor immune function. Its use in people with HIV/AIDS should be done with care. It is not recommended during pregnancy; however, the few times it has been given during pregnancy no problems resulted. The vaccine is available either by itself or along with the MMR vaccine, in a version known as the MMRV vaccine. It is made from weakened virus.

A live attenuated varicella vaccine, the Oka strain, was developed by Michiaki Takahashi and his colleagues in Japan in the early 1970s. American vaccinologist Maurice Hilleman's team developed a chickenpox vaccine in the United States in 1981, based on the "Oka strain" of the varicella virus. The chickenpox vaccine first became commercially available in 1984. It was first licensed for use in the US by Merck, under the brand name Varivax, in 1995. It is on the World Health Organization's List of Essential Medicines.

== Medical uses ==
Varicella vaccine is 70% to 90% effective for preventing varicella and more than 95% effective for preventing severe varicella. Follow-up evaluations have taken place in the United States of children immunized that revealed protection for at least 11 years. Studies were conducted in Japan which indicated protection for at least 20 years.

People who do not develop enough protection when they get the vaccine may develop a mild case of the disease when in close contact with a person with chickenpox. In these cases, people show very little sign of illness. This has been the case of children who get the vaccine in their early childhood and later have contact with children with chickenpox. Some of these children may develop mild chickenpox also known as breakthrough disease.

Another vaccine, known as zoster vaccine, is simply a larger-than-normal dose of the same vaccine used against chickenpox and is used in older adults to reduce the risk of shingles (also called herpes zoster) and postherpetic neuralgia, which are caused by the same virus. The recombinant zoster (shingles) vaccine is recommended for adults aged 50 years and older.

=== Duration of immunity ===
The long-term duration of protection from varicella vaccine is unknown, but there are now persons vaccinated twenty years ago with no evidence of waning immunity, while others have become vulnerable in as few as six years. Assessments of the duration of immunity are complicated in an environment where natural disease is still common, which typically leads to an overestimation of effectiveness.

Some vaccinated children have been found to lose their protective antibodies in as little as five to eight years. However, according to the World Health Organization (WHO): "After observation of study populations for periods of up to 20 years in Japan and 10 years in the United States, more than 90% of immunocompetent persons who were vaccinated as children were still protected from varicella." However, since only one out of five Japanese children were vaccinated, the annual exposure of these vaccinees to children with natural chickenpox boosted the vaccinees' immune system. In the United States, where universal varicella vaccination has been practiced, the majority of children no longer receive exogenous (outside) boosting, thus, their cell-mediated immunity to VZV (varicella zoster virus) wanes – necessitating booster chickenpox vaccinations. As time goes on, boosters may be necessary. Persons exposed to the virus after vaccination tend to experience milder cases of chickenpox if they develop the disease.

=== Chickenpox ===
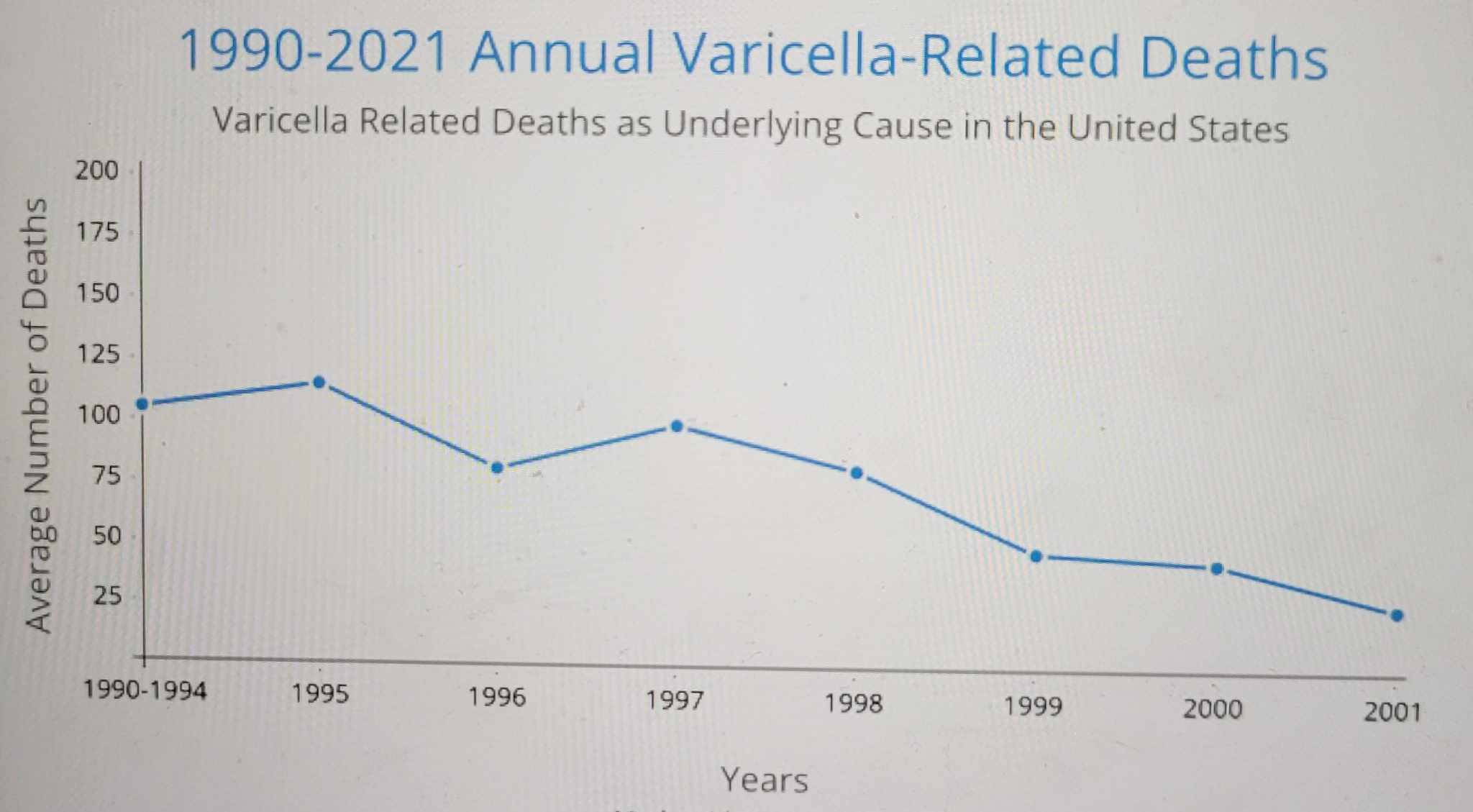
Shows gradual decline of varicella-related deaths as the underlying cause after the introduction of Varicella Vaccine in 1995 in the United States. Data obtained from "Decline in mortality due to varicella after implementation of varicella vaccination in the United States"(Nguyen et al., 2005)

Prior to the widespread introduction of the vaccine in the United States in 1995 (1986 in Japan and 1988 in Korea), there were around 4,000,000 cases per year in the United States, mostly in children, with typically 10,500–13,000 hospital admissions (range, 8,000–18,000), and 100–150 deaths each year. Most of the deaths were among young children.

During 2003, and the first half of 2004, the CDC reported eight deaths from varicella, six of whom were children or adolescents. These deaths and hospital admissions have substantially declined in the US due to vaccination, though the rate of shingles infection has increased as adults are less exposed to infected children (which would otherwise help protect against shingles). Ten years after the vaccine was recommended in the US, the CDC reported as much as a 90% drop in chickenpox cases, a varicella-related hospital admission decline of 71% and a 97% drop in chickenpox deaths among those under 20.

Vaccines are less effective among high-risk patients, as well as being more dangerous because they contain attenuated live viruses. In a study performed on children with an impaired immune system, 30% had lost the antibody after five years, and 8% had already caught wild chickenpox in those five years.

=== Herpes zoster ===
Herpes zoster (shingles) most often occurs in the elderly and is only rarely seen in children. The incidence of herpes zoster in vaccinated adults is 0.9/1000 person-years, and is 0.33/1000 person-years in vaccinated children; this is lower than the overall incidence of 3.2–4.2/1000 person-years.

The risk of developing shingles is reduced for children who receive the varicella vaccine, but not eliminated. The CDC stated in 2014: "Chickenpox vaccines contain weakened live VZV, which may cause latent (dormant) infection. The vaccine-strain VZV can reactivate later in life and cause shingles. However, the risk of getting shingles from vaccine-strain VZV after chickenpox vaccination is much lower than getting shingles after natural infection with wild-type VZV."

The risk of shingles is significantly lower among children who have received varicella vaccination, including those who are immunocompromised. The risk of shingles is approximately 80% lower among healthy vaccinated children compared to unvaccinated children who had wild-type varicella. A population with high varicella vaccination also has lower incidence of shingles in unvaccinated children, due to herd immunity.

=== Schedule ===
The WHO recommends one or two doses with the initial dose given at 12 to 18 months of age. The second dose, if given, should occur at least one to three months later. The second dose, if given, provides the additional benefit of improved protection against all varicella. This vaccine is a shot given subcutaneously (under the skin). It is recommended for all children under 13 and for everyone 13 or older who has never had chickenpox.

In the United States, two doses are recommended by the CDC. For a routine vaccination, the first dose is administered at 12 to 15 months of age and the second dose at age 4–6 years. However, the second dose can be given as early as 3 months after the first dose. If an individual misses the timing for the routine vaccination, the individual is eligible to receive a catch-up vaccination. For a catch-up vaccination, individuals between 7 and 12 years old should receive a two-dose series 3 months apart (a minimum interval of 4 weeks). For individuals 13–18 years old, the catch-up vaccination should be given 4 to 8 weeks apart (a minimum interval of 4 weeks). The varicella vaccine did not become widely available in the United States until 1995.

In the United Kingdom, the varicella vaccine has been added in 2026 to the routine children vaccination, combined with the MMR vaccine, at ages 12 and 18 months, starting with children born in 2025, with the possibility of catchup for children born in 2022, 2023 and 2024.

== Contraindications ==
The varicella vaccine is not recommended for seriously ill people, pregnant women, people who have tuberculosis, people who have experienced a serious allergic reaction to the varicella vaccine in the past, people who are allergic to gelatin, people allergic to neomycin, people receiving high doses of steroids, people receiving treatment for cancer with x-rays or chemotherapy, as well as people who have received blood products or transfusions during the past five months. Additionally, the varicella vaccine is not recommended for people who are taking salicylates (e.g. aspirin). After receiving the varicella vaccine, the use of salicylates should be avoided for at least six weeks. The varicella vaccine is also not recommended for individuals who have received a live vaccine in the last four weeks, because live vaccines that are administered too soon within one another may not be as effective. It may be usable in people with HIV infections who have a good blood count and are receiving appropriate treatment. Specific antiviral medication, such as acyclovir, famciclovir, or valacyclovir, are not recommended 24 hours before and 14 days after vaccination.

== Side effects ==
Serious side effects are very rare. From 1998 to 2013, only one vaccine-related death was reported: an English child with pre-existent leukemia. On some occasions, severe reactions such as meningitis and pneumonia have been reported (mainly in inadvertently vaccinated immunocompromised children) as well as anaphylaxis.

The possible mild side effects include redness, stiffness, and soreness at the injection site, as well as fever. A few people may develop a mild rash, which usually appears around the injection site.

There is a short-term risk of developing herpes zoster (shingles) following vaccination. However, this risk is less than the risk due to a natural infection resulting in chickenpox. Most of the cases reported have been mild and have not been associated with serious complications.

Approximately 5% of children who receive the vaccine develop a fever or rash. Adverse reaction reports for the period 1995 to 2005 found no deaths attributed to the vaccine despite approximately 55.7 million doses being delivered. Cases of vaccine-related chickenpox have been reported in patients with a weakened immune system, but no deaths.

The literature contains several reports of adverse reactions following varicella vaccination, including vaccine-strain zoster in children and adults.

== History ==
The varicella-zoster vaccine is made from the Oka/Merck strain of live attenuated varicella virus. The Oka virus was initially obtained from a child with natural varicella, introduced into human embryonic lung cell cultures, adapted to and propagated in embryonic guinea pig cell cultures, and finally propagated in a human diploid cell line originally derived from fetal tissues (WI-38). Takahashi and his colleagues used the Oka strain to develop a live attenuated varicella vaccine in Japan in the early 1970s. This strain was further developed by pharmaceutical companies such as Merck & Co. and GlaxoSmithKline. American vaccinologist Maurice Hilleman's team at Merck then used the Oka strain to prepare a chickenpox vaccine in 1981.

Japan was among the first countries to vaccinate for chickenpox. The vaccine developed by Hilleman was first licensed in the United States in 1995. Routine vaccination against varicella zoster virus is also performed in the United States, and the incidence of chickenpox has been dramatically reduced there (from four million cases per year in the pre-vaccine era to approximately 390,000 cases per year as of 2014).

As of 2019, standalone varicella vaccines are available in all 27 European Union member countries, and 16 countries also offer a combined measles, mumps, rubella, and varicella vaccine (MMRV). Twelve European countries (Austria, Andorra, Cyprus, Czech Republic, Finland, Germany, Greece, Hungary, Italy, Latvia, Luxembourg and Spain) have universal varicella vaccination (UVV) policies, though only six of these countries have made it available at no cost via government funding. EU member states that have not implemented UVV cite reasons such as "a perceived low disease burden and low public health priority," the cost and cost-effectiveness, the possible risk of herpes zoster when vaccinating older adults, and rare fevers leading to seizures after the first dose of the MMRV vaccine. "Countries that implemented UVV experienced decreases in varicella incidence, hospitalizations, and complications, showing overall beneficial impact."

Varicella vaccination is recommended in Canada for all healthy children aged 1 to 12, as well as susceptible adolescents and adults 50 years of age and younger; "may be considered for people with select immunodeficiency disorders"; and "should be prioritized" for susceptible individuals, including "non-pregnant women of childbearing age, household contacts of immunocompromised individuals, members of a household expecting a newborn, health care workers, adults who may be exposed occupationally to varicella (for example, people who work with young children), immigrants and refugees from tropical regions, people receiving chronic salicylate therapy (for example, acetylsalicylic acid [ASA])," and others.

Australia has adopted recommendations for routine immunization of children and susceptible adults against chickenpox.

In the United Kingdom, the varicella vaccine has been added in 2026 to the routine children vaccination, combined with the MMR vaccine, at ages 12 and 18 months.

Since 2013, the MMRV vaccine has been offered for free to all Brazilian citizens.

Other countries, such as France, have targeted recommendations for the vaccine, e.g. for children over 12 years who have not yet been infected with varicella.

== Society and culture ==
=== Catholic Church ===
The use of fetal tissue in vaccine development is the practice of researching, developing, and producing vaccines through growing viruses in cultured (laboratory-grown) cells that were originally derived from human fetal tissue. Since the cell strains in use originate from abortions, there has been some opposition to the practice and the resulting vaccines on religious and moral grounds.

The Roman Catholic Church is opposed to abortion. Nevertheless, the Pontifical Academy for Life stated in 2017 that "clinically recommended vaccinations can be used with a clear conscience and that the use of such vaccines does not signify some sort of cooperation with voluntary abortion". On 21 December 2020, the Vatican's doctrinal office, the Congregation for the Doctrine of the Faith, further clarified that it is "morally licit" for Catholics to receive vaccines derived from fetal cell lines or in which such lines were used in testing or development, because "passive material cooperation in the procured abortion from which these cell lines originate is, on the part of those making use of the resulting vaccines, remote" and "does not and should not in any way imply that there is a moral endorsement of the use of cell lines proceeding from aborted fetuses".
