= MMRV vaccine =

Combination vaccine against measles, mumps, rubella, and varicella viruses

Combination of
- Measles vaccine: Vaccine
- Mumps vaccine: Vaccine
- Rubella vaccine: Vaccine
- Varicella vaccine: Vaccine

Clinical data
- Trade names: Proquad, Priorix Tetra
- Other names: Measles, Mumps, Rubella, and Varicella Virus Vaccine Live
- AHFS/Drugs.com: Monograph
- License data: US DailyMed: Proquad
- Pregnancy category: AU: B2
- Routes of administration: Subcutaneous, intramuscular
- ATC code: J07BD54 (WHO)

Legal status
- Legal status: AU: S4 (Prescription only); CA: ℞-only / Schedule D; US: ℞-only; EU: Rx-only; In general: ℞ (Prescription only)

Identifiers
- CAS Number: 1704519-64-1
- ChemSpider: none

The MMRV vaccine is a combination vaccine against measles, mumps, rubella (German measles), and varicella (chickenpox). It contains the combined measles vaccine, mumps vaccine, rubella vaccine, and varicella vaccine into a single injection. The MMRV vaccine has similar immunogenicity and overall safety profiles to the MMR vaccine administered with or without the varicella vaccine. The MMRV vaccine is typically given to children between one and two years of age.

Several companies supply MMRV vaccines. Proquad is marketed by Merck and was approved in 2005, for use in the United States for children aged twelve months of age through twelve years of age. Stand-alone virus measles, mumps, rubella, and varicella vaccines had been previously licensed in 1963, 1967, 1969, and 1995, respectively. An MMRV vaccine called Priorix Tetra by GlaxoSmithKline is available in some of the member states of the European Union.

== Recommendations ==
The MMRV vaccine, a combined MMR and varicella vaccine, simplifies the administration of the vaccines.

== Adverse events ==
Rare but serious adverse events reported following Proquad vaccination include allergic reactions, including swelling of the lips, tongue, or face; difficulty breathing or closing of the throat; hives; paleness; weakness; dizziness; a fast heartbeat; deafness; long-term seizures, coma, or lowered consciousness; seizures (jerking or staring) caused by fever; or temporary low platelet count.

For children aged two and younger, the MMRV vaccine is associated with significantly more adverse events compared to separate administration of MMR and varicella vaccinations on the same day. There are 4.3 additional febrile seizures per 10,000 vaccinated children (95% CI 2.6–5.6), 7.5 additional mostly mild fever episodes per 100 vaccinated children (95% CI, 5.4–9.4) and 1.1 additional measles-like rash per 100 children (95% CI, 0.2–1.8). Febrile seizures caused by the MMRV vaccine occur 7 to 10 days after vaccination. In children age 4–6, there is no evidence for an increased risk in febrile seizures after the administration of Proquad compared to the separate administration of MMR and Varicella vaccines.

== Legal status ==
Proquad was approved for medical use in the United States in September 2005, in the European Union in April 2006, in Australia in February 2007, and in Canada in May 2014.

Priorix Tetra was approved for medical use in Australia in November 2005, and in Canada in June 2008.
