= MMR vaccine =

Combined vaccine against measles, mumps, and rubella

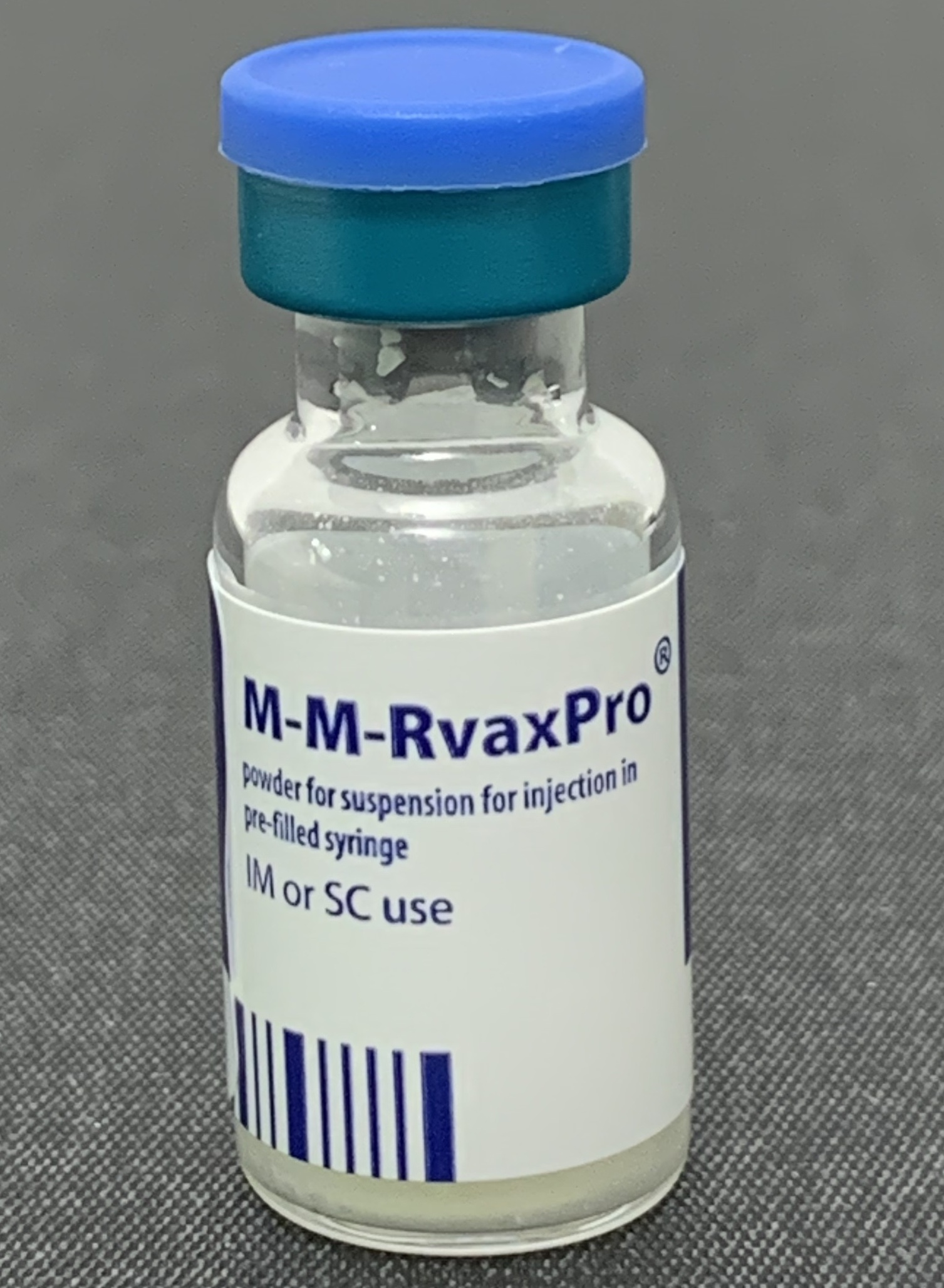
- MMR vaccine

Combination of
- Measles vaccine: Vaccine
- Mumps vaccine: Vaccine
- Rubella vaccine: Vaccine

Clinical data
- Trade names: M-M-R II, Priorix, Tresivac, others
- Other names: MPR vaccine
- AHFS/Drugs.com: Monograph
- MedlinePlus: a601176
- License data: US DailyMed: Measles
- Pregnancy category: AU: B2
- ATC code: J07BD52 (WHO)

Legal status
- Legal status: AU: S4 (Prescription only); UK: POM (Prescription only); US: ℞-only; EU: Rx-only; In general: ℞ (Prescription only)

Identifiers
- CAS Number: 1704518-68-2
- ChemSpider: None

The MMR vaccine (abbreviated as MMR) is a combination vaccine against measles, mumps, and rubella (German measles). It contains the combined measles vaccine, mumps vaccine, and rubella vaccine into a single injection. After two doses, 97% of people are protected against measles, 88% against mumps, and at least 97% against rubella. The vaccine is also recommended for those who do not have evidence of immunity, those with well-controlled HIV/AIDS, and within 72 hours of exposure to measles among those who are incompletely immunized. It is given by injection.

Measles is a highly contagious viral illness that can lead to serious complications, including pneumonia, acute encephalitis, and, in rare cases, long‑term neurological disease. Pregnant women are at increased risk of severe respiratory complications and adverse pregnancy outcomes such as pregnancy loss and premature birth.

The MMR vaccine is widely used around the world. As of 2012, 575 million doses had been administered since the vaccine's introduction worldwide. Measles resulted in 2.6 million deaths per year before immunization became common. This has decreased to 122,000 deaths per year as of 2012, mostly in low-income countries. Through vaccination, as of 2018, rates of measles in North and South America are very low. Rates of disease have been seen to increase in populations that go unvaccinated. Between 2000 and 2018, vaccination decreased measles deaths by 73%.

Side effects of immunization are generally mild and resolve without any specific treatment. These may include fever, as well as pain or redness at the injection site. Severe allergic reactions occur in about one in a million people. Because it contains live viruses, the MMR vaccine is not recommended during pregnancy but may be given during breastfeeding. The vaccine is safe to give at the same time as other vaccines. Being recently immunized does not increase the risk of passing measles, mumps, or rubella on to others: That is, even though the vaccine contains live viruses, they are not transmitted. There is no evidence of an association between MMR immunization and autistic spectrum disorders. The MMR vaccine is a mixture of live weakened viruses of the three diseases.

The MMR vaccine was developed by Maurice Hilleman. It was licensed for use in the US by Merck in 1971. Stand-alone measles, mumps, and rubella vaccines had been previously licensed in 1963, 1967, and 1969, respectively. Recommendations for a second dose were introduced in 1989. The MMRV vaccine, which also covers chickenpox, may be used instead. An MR vaccine, without coverage for mumps, is also occasionally used.

== Medical use ==
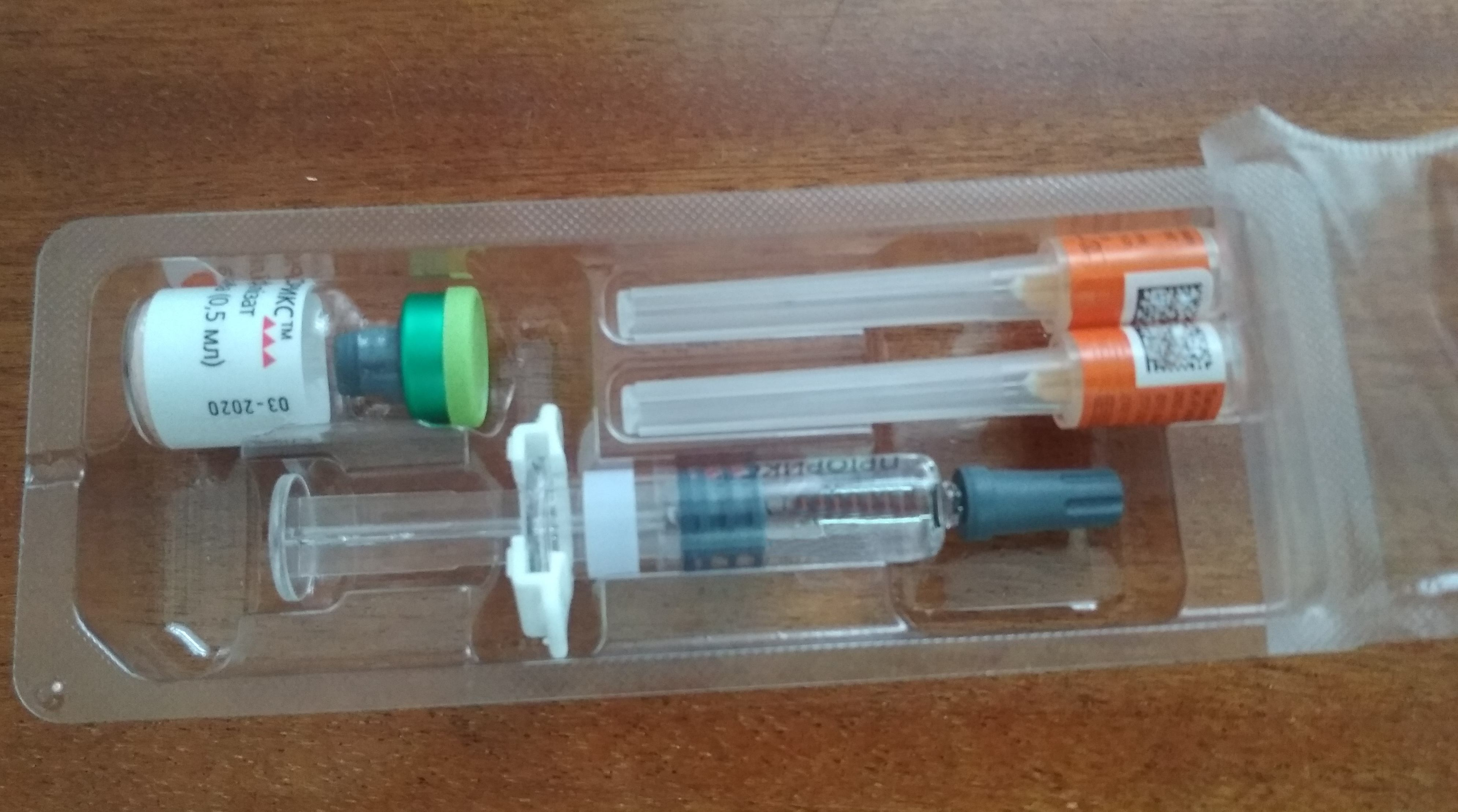
Priorix

Cochrane concluded that the "Existing evidence on the safety and effectiveness of MMR and MMRV vaccine supports current policies of mass immunisation aimed at global measles eradication to reduce morbidity and mortality associated with measles mumps rubella and varicella."

The combined MMR vaccine induces immunity less painfully than three separate injections at the same time, and sooner and more efficiently than three injections given on different dates. Public Health England reports that providing a single combined vaccine as of 1988, rather than giving the option to have them also done separately, increased uptake of the vaccine.

=== Measles ===
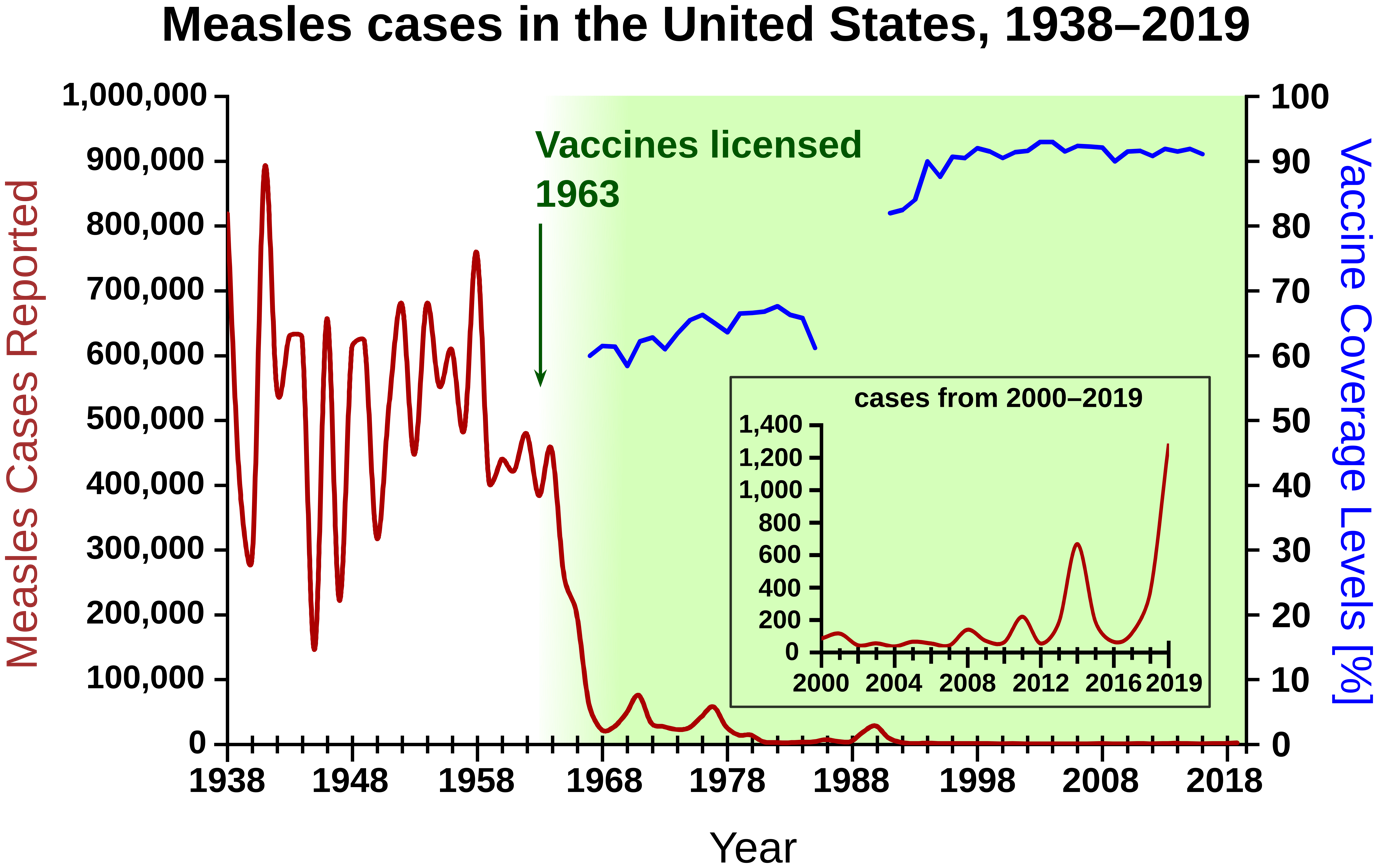
Measles cases reported in the United States fell drastically after the introduction of the measles vaccine.

Before the widespread use of a vaccine against measles, rates of disease were so high that infection was felt to be "as inevitable as death and taxes." Reported cases of measles in the United States fell from hundreds of thousands to tens of thousands per year following introduction of the vaccine in 1963. Increasing uptake of the vaccine following outbreaks in 1971, and 1977, brought this down to thousands of cases per year in the 1980s. An outbreak of almost 30,000 cases in 1990 led to a renewed push for vaccination and the addition of a second vaccine to the recommended schedule. Fewer than 200 cases were reported in the US each year between 1997 and 2013, and the disease was no longer considered endemic there during that time.

The benefit of measles vaccination in preventing illness, disability, and death has been well documented. The first 20 years of licensed measles vaccination in the US prevented an estimated 52 million cases of the disease, 17,400 cases of intellectual disability, and 5,200 deaths. During 1999–2004, a strategy led by the World Health Organization and UNICEF led to improvements in measles vaccination coverage that averted an estimated 1.4 million measles deaths worldwide. Between 2000 and 2018, measles vaccination resulted in a 73% decrease in deaths from the disease.

Measles is common in many areas of the world. Although it was declared eliminated from the US in 2000, high rates of vaccination and good communication with people who refuse vaccination are needed to prevent outbreaks and sustain the elimination of measles in the US. Of the 66 cases of measles reported in the US in 2005, slightly over half were attributable to one unvaccinated individual who acquired measles during a visit to Romania. This individual returned to a community with many unvaccinated children. The resulting outbreak infected 34 people, mostly children and virtually all unvaccinated; 9% were hospitalized, and the cost of containing the outbreak was estimated at $167,685. A major epidemic was averted due to high rates of vaccination in the surrounding communities.

In 2017, an outbreak of measles occurred among the Somali-American community in Minnesota, where MMR vaccination rates had declined due to the misconception that the vaccine could cause autism. The US Centers for Disease Control and Prevention recorded 65 affected children in the outbreak by April 2017.

In 2026, the Pan American Health Organization revoked the US measles elimination status following one year of continuous local transmission.

=== Rubella ===
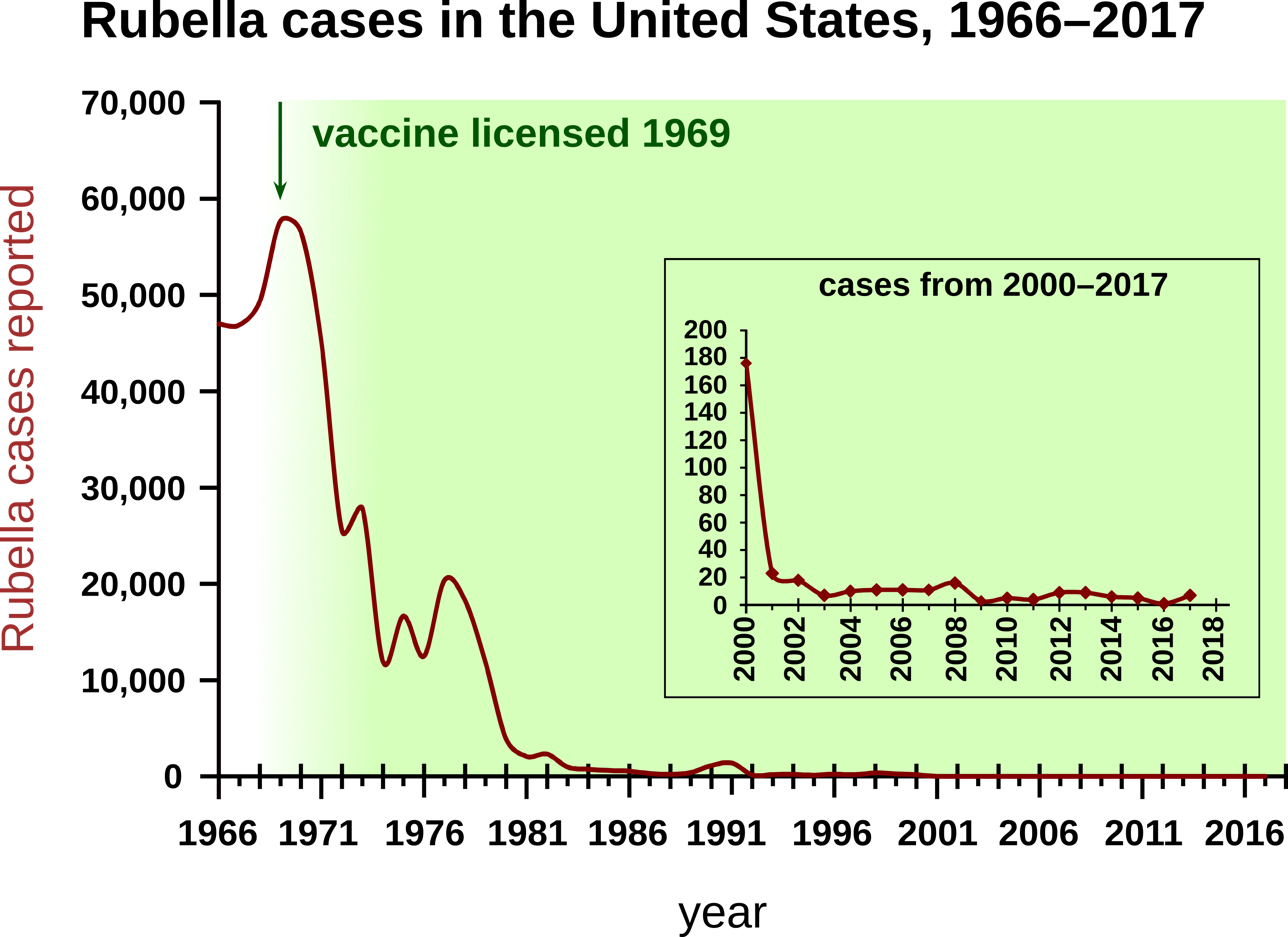
Rubella rates fell sharply in the United States when immunization was introduced.

Rubella, also known as German measles, was also very common before widespread vaccination. The major risk of rubella is during pregnancy when the baby may contract congenital rubella, which can cause significant congenital defects.

=== Mumps ===
Mumps is another viral disease that was once very common, especially during childhood. If mumps is acquired by a male who is past puberty, a possible complication is bilateral orchitis, which can in some cases lead to sterility.

=== Administration ===
The MMR vaccine is administered by a subcutaneous injection, the first dose typically at twelve months of age. The second dose may be given as early as one month after the first dose. The second dose is a dose to produce immunity in the small number of persons (2–5%) who fail to develop measles immunity after the first dose. In the US it is done before entry to kindergarten because that is a convenient time. Areas where measles is common typically recommend the first dose at nine months of age and the second dose at fifteen months of age.

== Safety ==
Adverse reactions, rarely serious, may occur from each component of the MMR vaccine. Ten percent of children develop fever, malaise, and a rash 5–21 days after the first vaccination; and 3% develop joint pain lasting 18 days on average. Older women appear to be more at risk of joint pain, acute arthritis, and even (rarely) chronic arthritis. Anaphylaxis is an extremely rare but serious allergic reaction to the vaccine. One cause can be egg allergy. In 2014, the FDA approved two additional possible adverse events on the vaccination label: acute disseminated encephalomyelitis (ADEM), and transverse myelitis, with permission to also add "difficulty walking" to the package inserts. A 2012 IOM report found that the measles component of the MMR vaccine can cause measles inclusion body encephalitis in immunocompromised individuals. This report also rejected any connection between the MMR vaccine and autism. Some versions of the vaccine contain the antibiotic neomycin and therefore should not be used in people allergic to this antibiotic.

The number of reports on neurological disorders is very small, other than evidence for an association between a form of the MMR vaccine containing the Urabe mumps strain and rare adverse events of aseptic meningitis, a form of viral meningitis. The UK National Health Service stopped using the Urabe mumps strain in the early 1990s due to cases of transient mild viral meningitis, and switched to a form using the Jeryl Lynn mumps strain instead. The Urabe strain remains in use in a number of countries; MMR with the Urabe strain is much cheaper to manufacture than with the Jeryl Lynn strain, and a strain with higher efficacy along with a somewhat higher rate of mild side effects may still have the advantage of reduced incidence of overall adverse events.

A Cochrane review found that, compared with placebo, MMR vaccine was associated with fewer upper respiratory tract infections, more irritability, and a similar number of other adverse effects.

Naturally acquired measles often occurs with immune thrombocytopenic purpura (ITP, a purpuric rash and an increased tendency to bleed that resolves within two months in children), occurring in 1 to 20,000 cases. Approximately 1 in 40,000 children are thought to acquire ITP in the six weeks following an MMR vaccination. ITP below the age of six years is generally a mild disease, rarely having long-term consequences.

=== False claims about autism ===
In 1998 Andrew Wakefield et al. published a fraudulent paper about twelve children, reportedly with bowel symptoms and autism or other disorders acquired soon after administration of MMR vaccine, while supporting a competing vaccine. In 2010, Wakefield's research was found by the General Medical Council to have been "dishonest", and The Lancet fully retracted the paper. Three months following The Lancet's retraction, Wakefield was struck off the UK medical register, with a statement identifying deliberate falsification in the research published in The Lancet, and was barred from practising medicine in the UK. The research was declared fraudulent in 2011 by the British Medical Journal.

Since Wakefield's publication, multiple peer-reviewed studies have failed to show any association between the vaccine and autism. The US Centers for Disease Control and Prevention, the Institute of Medicine of the US National Academy of Sciences, the UK National Health Service and the Cochrane Library review have all concluded that there is no evidence of a link.

Administering the vaccines in three separate doses does not reduce the chance of adverse effects, and it increases the opportunity for infection by the two diseases not immunized against first. However, on August 10, 2026, US president Donald Trump signed an executive order requiring the MMR vaccine to be split into three separate shots, and recommending that "to the maximum extent feasible, all childhood immunizations should be administered at separate medical visits". During the signing, Trump stated that the new recommendation "has to do with many subjects including autism in particular"; he and Robert F. Kennedy Jr., secretary of health and human services, made numerous references to autism throughout the signing.

Health experts have criticized media reporting of the MMR-autism controversy for triggering a decline in vaccination rates. Before publication of Wakefield's article, the inoculation rate for MMR in the UK was 92%; after publication, the rate dropped to below 80%. In 1998, there were 56 measles cases in the UK; by 2008, there were 1348 cases, with two confirmed deaths.

In Japan, the MMR triplet is not used. Immunity is achieved by a combination vaccine for measles and rubella, followed up later with a mumps only vaccine. This has had no effect on autism rates in the country, further disproving the MMR autism hypothesis.

== History ==
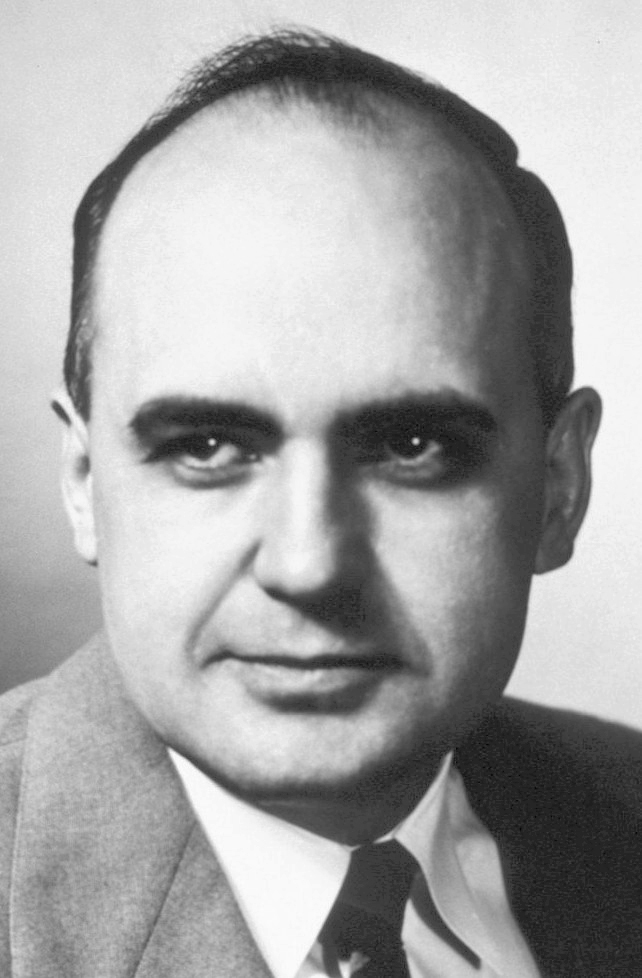
Maurice Hilleman, who developed the MMR vaccine

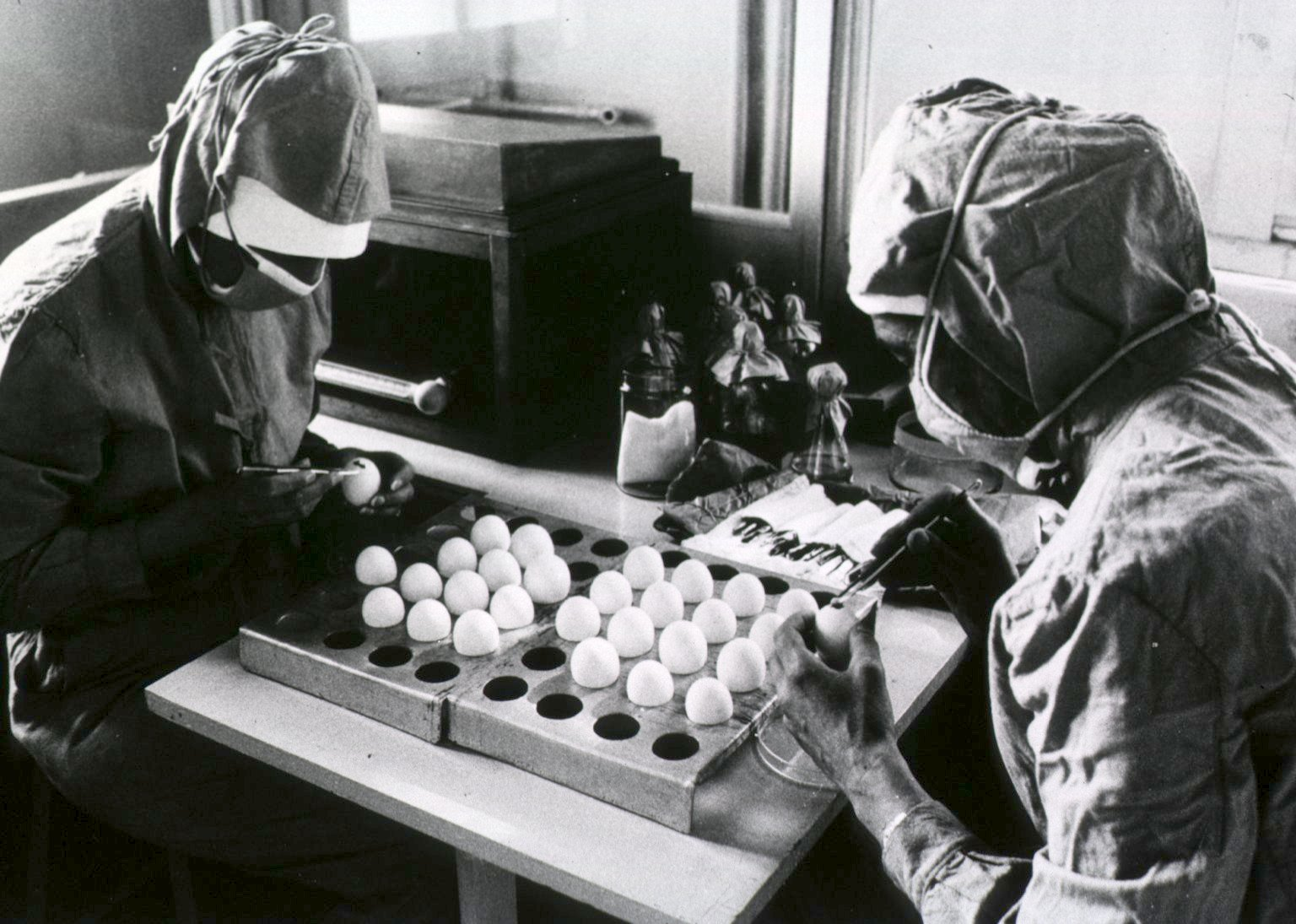
Two workers make openings in chicken eggs in preparation for a measles vaccine.

The component viral strains of MMR vaccine were developed by propagation in animal and human cells.

For example, in the case of mumps and measles viruses, the virus strains were grown in embryonated chicken eggs. This produced strains of virus which were adapted for chicken cells and less well-suited for human cells. These strains are therefore called attenuated strains. They are sometimes referred to as neuroattenuated because these strains are less virulent to human neurons than the wild strains.

The rubella component, Meruvax, was developed in 1967, through propagation using the human embryonic lung cell line WI-38 (named for the Wistar Institute) that was derived six years earlier in 1961.

Disease immunized	Component vaccine	Virus strain	Propagation medium	Growth medium
Measles	Attenuvax	Enders' attenuated Edmonston strain	chick embryo cell culture	Medium 199
Mumps	Mumpsvax	Jeryl Lynn (B level) strain	chick embryo cell culture	Medium 199
Rubella	Meruvax II	Wistar RA 27/3 strain of live attenuated rubella virus	WI-38 human embryonic cell line	MEM (solution containing buffered salts, fetal bovine serum, human serum albumin and neomycin, etc.)

The term "MPR vaccine" is also used to refer to this vaccine, whereas "P" refers to parotitis which is caused by mumps.

Merck MMR II is supplied freeze-dried (lyophilized) and contains live viruses. Before injection, it is reconstituted with the solvent provided.

According to a review published in 2018, the GlaxoSmithKline (GSK) MMR vaccine known as Pluserix "contains the Schwarz measles virus, the Jeryl Lynn–like mumps strain, and RA27/3 rubella virus".

Pluserix was introduced in Hungary in 1999. Enders' Edmonston strain has been used since 1999 in Hungary in Merck MMR II product. GSK Priorix vaccine, which uses attenuated Schwarz Measles, was introduced in Hungary in 2003.

== MMRV vaccine ==
The MMRV vaccine, a combined measles, mumps, rubella, and varicella (chickenpox) vaccine is used as a replacement for the MMR vaccine to simplify the administration of the vaccines.

== MR vaccine ==
The MR vaccine (abbreviated "MRV") is a vaccine for measles and rubella, not mumps. In 2014, the World Health Organization reported it as used in a "few (unidentified) countries". A MRV delivered by a microneedle patch was the subject of a study reported in 2024.

== Society and culture ==
=== Religious concerns ===
Some brands of the vaccine use gelatin, derived from pigs, as a stabilizer. This has caused reduced take-up among some communities, despite the fact that alternative vaccines without pig derivatives are approved and available.
