= Vaccination policy =

Health policy in relation to vaccination

Rotavirus vaccine immunization schedule

A vaccination policy is a health policy adopted in order to prevent the spread of infectious disease. These policies are generally put into place by state or local governments, but may also be set by private facilities, such as workplaces or schools. Many policies have been developed and implemented since vaccines were first made widely available.

The main purpose of implementing a vaccination policy is complete eradication of a disease, as was done with smallpox. This, however, can be a difficult feat to accomplish or even confirm. Many governmental public health agencies (such as the CDC or ECDC) rely on vaccination policies to create a herd immunity within their populations. Immunization advisory committees are usually responsible for providing those in leadership positions with information used to make evidence-based decisions regarding vaccines and other health policies.

Vaccination policies vary from country to country, with some mandating them and others strongly recommending them. Some places only require them for people utilizing government services, like welfare or public schools. A government or facility may pay for all or part of the costs of vaccinations, such as in a national vaccination schedule, or job requirement. Cost-benefit analyses of vaccinations have shown that there is an economic incentive to implement policies, as vaccinations save the State time and money by reducing the burden preventable diseases and epidemics have on healthcare facilities and funds.

== Goals ==
=== Individual and herd immunity ===

Vaccination policies aim to produce immunity to preventable diseases. Besides individual protection from getting ill, some vaccination policies also aim to provide the community as a whole with herd immunity. Herd immunity refers to the idea that the pathogen will have trouble spreading when a significant part of the population has immunity against it, reducing the effect an infectious disease has on society. This protects those unable to get the vaccine due to medical conditions, such as immune disorders. However, for herd immunity to be effective in a population, a majority of those who are vaccine-eligible must be vaccinated.

Vaccine-preventable diseases remain a common cause of childhood mortality with an estimated three million deaths each year. Every year, vaccination prevents between two and three million deaths worldwide, across all age groups, from diphtheria, tetanus, pertussis and measles.

=== Eradication of diseases ===
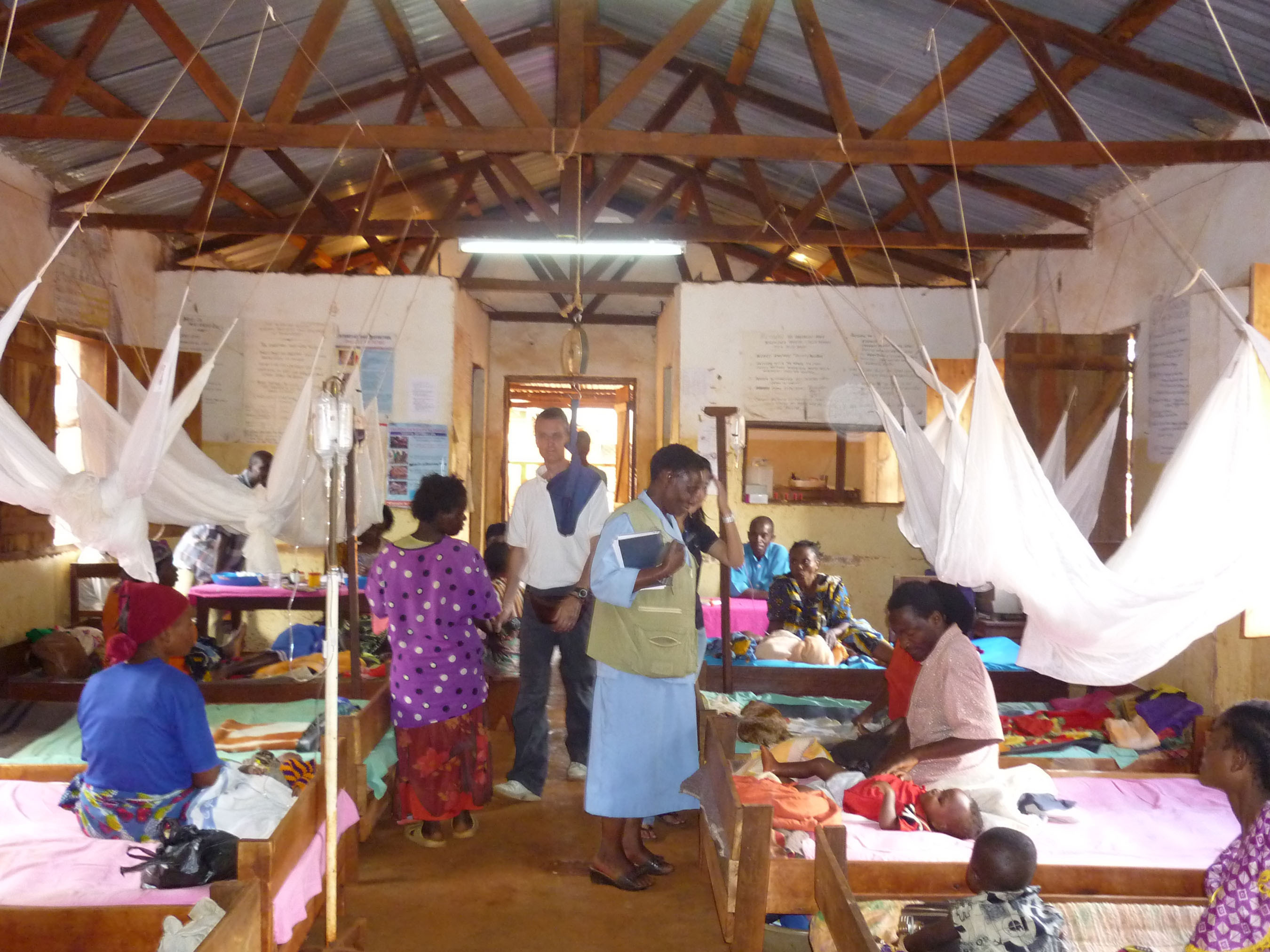
Malaria Clinic in Tanzania helped by SMS for Life

With some vaccines, a goal of vaccination policies is to eradicate the disease – disappear it from Earth altogether. The World Health Organization (WHO) coordinated the effort to eradicate smallpox globally through vaccination, the last naturally occurring case of smallpox was in Somalia in 1977. Endemic measles, mumps and rubella have been eliminated through vaccination in Finland. On 14 October 2010, the UN Food and Agriculture Organization declared that rinderpest had been eradicated. The WHO is currently working to eradicate polio, which was eliminated in Africa in August 2020 and remained only in Pakistan and Afghanistan at the time.

=== Individual versus group goals ===
The likely behavior of individuals when offered vaccines can be modeled economically using ideas from game theory. According to such models, individuals will attempt to minimize the risk of illness, and may seek vaccination for themselves or their children if they perceive a high threat of disease and a low risk to vaccination. However, if a vaccination program successfully reduces the disease threat, it may reduce the perceived risk of disease enough so that an individual's optimal strategy is to encourage everyone but their family to be vaccinated, or (more generally) to refuse vaccination once vaccination rates reach a certain level, even if this level is below that optimal for the community. For example, a 2003 study predicted that a bioterrorist attack using smallpox would result in conditions where voluntary vaccination would be unlikely to reach the optimum level for the U.S. as a whole, and a 2007 study predicted that severe influenza epidemics cannot be prevented by voluntary vaccination without offering certain incentives.

Governments often allow exemptions to mandatory vaccinations for religious or philosophical reasons, but decreased rates of vaccination may cause loss of herd immunity, substantially increasing risks even to vaccinated individuals. However, mandatory vaccination policies raise ethical issues regarding parental rights and informed consent.

Fractional dose vaccination is a strategy that trades societal benefit for individual vaccine efficacy, has proven to be effective in randomized trials in poverty diseases, and in epidemiologic models was thought to hold a significant potential for shortening the COVID-19 pandemic when vaccine supply is limited.

== Compulsory vaccination ==
At various times, governments and other institutions have established policies requiring vaccination with the aim of reducing the risk of disease. An 1853 law required universal vaccination against smallpox in England and Wales, with fines levied against people who did not comply. These policies stirred resistance from a variety of groups, collectively called anti-vaccinationists, who objected on ethical, political, medical safety, religious, and other grounds. In the United States, the Supreme Court ruled in Jacobson v. Massachusetts (1905) that states have the authority to require vaccination against smallpox during a smallpox epidemic. All fifty U.S. states require that children be vaccinated to attend public school, although 47 states provide exemptions based on religious or philosophical beliefs. In the European Union, the 2021 case of Vavřička and Others v. the Czech Republic, decided by the European Court of Human Rights (ECtHR), held that the nation of the Czech Republic did not violate the European Convention on Human Rights by imposing a vaccination mandate on children in that country.

Forced vaccination (as opposed to fines or refusal of services) is uncommon, and typically happens only as an emergency measure during an outbreak. This has been reported in parts of China. Compulsory vaccinations greatly reduce infection rates for the diseases they protect against.

Common objections included the argument that governments should not infringe on individuals' freedom to make medical decisions for themselves or their children, or claims that proposed vaccinations were dangerous. Many modern vaccination policies allow exemptions for people with compromised immune systems, allergies to vaccination components, or strongly held objections.

In 1904, in the city of Rio de Janeiro, Brazil, following an urban renewal program that displaced many poor, a government program of mandatory smallpox vaccination triggered the Vaccine Revolt, several days of rioting with considerable property damage and a number of deaths.

Compulsory vaccination is a difficult policy issue, requiring authorities to balance public health with individual liberty:

Vaccination is unique among de facto mandatory requirements in the modern era, requiring individuals to accept the injection of medicine or medicinal agent into their bodies, and it has provoked a spirited opposition. This opposition began with the first vaccinations, has not ceased, and probably never will. From this realisation arises a difficult issue: how should the mainstream medical authorities approach the anti-vaccination movement? A passive reaction could be construed as endangering the health of society, whereas a heavy-handed approach can threaten the values of individual liberty and freedom of expression that we cherish.

An ethical dilemma may emerge when health care providers attempt to persuade vaccine-hesitant families towards receiving vaccinations as this persuasion may lead to violating their autonomy. Investigation of different types of vaccination policy finds strong evidence that standing orders and allowing healthcare workers without prescription authority (such as nurses) to administer vaccines in defined circumstances increase vaccination rates, and sufficient evidence that requiring vaccinations before attending child care and schools also does so. There is also evidence that mandatory vaccination policies for healthcare workers, for instance for influenza shots, increase uptake. One argument among public health professionals is that compulsory vaccination is necessary in severe circumstances, but that it should be approached carefully in order to avoid polarizing the population and decreasing trust in the long term.

Many countries (Canada, Germany, Japan, and the United States) have specific requirements for reporting vaccine-related adverse effects; others (Australia, France, and the United Kingdom) include vaccines under their general requirements for reporting injuries associated with medical treatments. A number of countries have both compulsory vaccination and national programs for the compensation of injuries alleged to have been caused by a vaccination.

In November 2021, during the fourth wave of the COVID-19 pandemic, while the Austrian vaccination rate was low (79%) compared to the rest of Western Europe, the Austrian government made vaccination mandatory: Austria banned unvaccinated individuals from leaving their home apart from going to work, buying essential supplies, or exercise, in an effort to reduce the spread of disease.

=== Parents' versus children's rights ===
Medical ethicist Arthur Caplan argues that children have a right to the best available medical care, including vaccines, regardless of parental opinions toward vaccines, saying, "Arguments about medical freedom and choice are at odds with the human and constitutional rights of children. When parents won't protect them, governments must." However, government entities, such as Child Protective Services, can intervene only when the parents directly harm their child via abuse or neglect, considering a child does not have the ability to give or take away consent. Although withholding medical care meets the criteria of abuse or neglect, refusing vaccinations does not, as the child is not being harmed directly.

To prevent the spread of disease by unvaccinated individuals, some schools and doctors' surgeries have prohibited unvaccinated children from being enrolled, even where not required by law. Doctors who refuse to treat unvaccinated children harm both the child and public health, and may be considered unethical when parents are unable to find another provider. Opinion on this is divided, with the largest professional association, the American Academy of Pediatrics, saying that exclusion of unvaccinated children may be an option under narrowly defined circumstances.

One historical example is the 1990–91 Philadelphia measles outbreak, which led to the deaths of nine children in an anti-vaccination faith healing community. Court orders were obtained to have infected children given life-saving medical treatment, against the wishes of their parents, and also for healthy children to be vaccinated without parental consent.

=== In schools and daycare ===
Vaccination requirements for access to daycare and schools increase vaccine uptake in the United States and there is evidence that these requirements may decrease disease. However, the majority of studies of mandatory vaccination took place in the US and the cultural climate in United States is quite different from other industrialized nations. A study shows that many Europeans countries have whooping cough vaccination rates as high as those in the United States despite no mandates. Canada has a similar vaccination to the US despite 11 of its provinces and territories having no vaccine mandates, which may in part be due to vaccination programs taking place in school in Canada.

=== Non-medical exemptions and 'Nudge Theory' ===
Research has increasingly explored behavioral economics strategies to increase voluntary vaccination uptake referred to as 'nudge theory'. These approaches aim to influence decision-making without coercion by altering the context in which choices are made. Examples include reminder systems, social norm messaging, and educational prompts. In Australia, Helen Marshall and colleagues have led research applying nudge theory to improve vaccine uptake among medically at-risk populations. The EPIC study, published in BMJ Open in 2024, tested interventions such as SMS reminders, pledges, and short educational videos to increase COVID-19 and influenza vaccination rates among children with chronic conditions. Globally, systematic reviews indicate that nudge-based interventions can modestly improve COVID-19 vaccination uptake.

These behavioral strategies are often discussed alongside debates about compulsory vaccination and exemptions. Scholars such as Mark Navin argue that while mandates remain common, policies should balance public health goals with respect for parental autonomy. Navin suggests that nonmedical exemptions should remain available but be made more burdensome to discourage casual refusal, rather than eliminated entirely.

== Immunity acquired through deliberate infection ==
In the United Kingdom, children are not vaccinated against chickenpox despite the availability of a vaccine since the 1990s. Modelling predicted that vaccinating children would increase the number of cases amongst adults due to the absence of natural boosting from exposure to chickenpox in day-to-day life. The Joint Committee on Vaccination and Immunisation were concerned that more pregnant women would become infected because immunity in the general population would decrease .

== Planning vaccination policy ==
=== Vaccination committees ===
Vaccination policy is typically proposed by national or supranational advisory committees on immunization, and in many cases, is regulated by the government.

=== Vaccination strategy models ===
Predictive vaccination strategy models play an important role in predicting effectiveness of vaccination strategies at population level. The may, e.g., compare the sequence of age groups to be vaccinated and study the outcome in terms of caseload, deaths, length of a pandemic, healthcare system load, and economic impact.

== Evaluating vaccination policy ==
=== Vaccines as a positive externality ===
The promotion of high levels of vaccination produces the protective effect of herd immunity as well as positive externalities in society. Large scale vaccination is a public good, in that the benefits obtained by an individual from large scale vaccination are both non-rivalrous and non-excludable, and given these traits, individuals may avoid the costs of vaccination by "free-riding" off the benefits of others being vaccinated. The costs and benefits to individuals and society have been studied and critiqued in stable and changing population designs. Other surveys have indicated that free-riding incentives exist in individual decisions, and in a separate study that looked at parental vaccination choice, the study found that parents were less likely to vaccinate their children if their children's friends had already been vaccinated.

=== Trust in vaccination ===
Trust in vaccines and in the health system is an important element of public health programs that aim to deliver life-saving vaccines. Trust in vaccination and health care is an important indicator of government work and the effectiveness of the social policy. The success in overcoming diseases and in vaccination depends on the level of trust in vaccines and health care. The lack of trust in vaccines and immunization programs can lead to vaccine refusal, risking disease outbreaks, and challenging immunization goals in high- and low-income settings. Today, the medical and scientific communities obviously face a big challenge where vaccines are concerned, namely enhancing the trust with which the general public regards the entire endeavor. Indeed, earning the public's trust in public health is a big challenge. Accurately, studying the trust in vaccines, and understanding the factors that affect the reduction of trust, allows authorities to build an effective vaccine campaign and communication strategies to fight the disease. Trust is a key parameter to work with before and while undertaking any vaccine campaigns. The state is responsible for providing smart communication, and to inform a population about diseases, vaccines, and the risks of both. The WHO recommends that states work long-term, to build population resilience against vaccine myths and scares, to develop a strong campaign that is well prepared to respond to any event that may erode trust, and respond immediately to any event which may erode trust in health authorities. A review of 34 studies into communication strategies to tackle untruths about vaccines has also suggested strategies that are helpful, such as communicating scientific consensus and using humour to dispel myths, and unhelpful, such as scare tactics.

=== Cost-benefit: United States ===
The first economic analysis of routine childhood immunizations in the United States took place in 2001, and reported cost savings over the lifetime of children born that year. Other analyses of the economic costs and potential benefits to individuals and society have since been evaluated. In 2014, the American Academy of Pediatrics published a decision analysis that evaluated direct costs, such as program costs, vaccine cost, administrative burden, negative vaccine-linked reactions, and transportation time lost to parents. The study focused on several communicable diseases, including diphtheria, tetanus, pertussis, measles, hepatitis A and B, and varicella (chickenpox), but did not include seasonal flu vaccines. Estimated costs and benefits were adjusted to 2009 dollars and projected over time at three percent interest. Of the theoretical group of 4,261,494 babies, beginning in 2009, who had followed a standard childhood immunization schedule under the Advisory Committee on Immunization Practices guidelines "will prevent ≈42,000 early deaths and 20 million cases of disease, with net savings of $13.5 billion in direct costs and $68.8 billion in total societal costs, respectively." In the United States, and in other nations, there is an economic incentive and "global value" to invest in preventive vaccination programs, especially in children as a means to prevent early infant and childhood deaths. Socioeconomic disparities have been found to hinder reasonable access to vaccinations in the U.S., and it has also been found that even if such status is not a factor, "racial ethnic minority adults are less likely than whites to receive preventive care including vaccination".

=== Cost-benefit for older adults ===
There is an economic incentive to establish vaccination programs for older adults as the general population is aging due to increasing life expectancy and decreasing birth rates. Vaccinations can reduce the issues linked with both polypharmacy and antibiotic-resistant bacteria in the older demographic with comorbidities by preventing infectious diseases and decreasing the necessity of polypharmacy and antibiotics. One 2016 study done in Western Europe found that the estimated cost of vaccinating one person over a lifetime against 10–17 potentially debilitating pathogens would be €443–3,395 (equivalent to €544–4,172 in 2023). Another study found that if 75% of adults over 65 were vaccinated against seasonal influenza, 3.2–3.8 million cases and 35,000–52,000 influenza-related deaths could be avoided, and €438–558 million saved annually, solely on the European continent.

== International Organizations ==
In 2006, the World Health Organization and UNICEF created the Global Immunization Vision and Strategy (GIVS). This organization created a ten-year strategy with four main goals:

- to immunize more people against more diseases
- to introduce a range of newly available vaccines and technologies
- to integrate other critical health interventions with immunization
- to manage vaccination programmes within the context of global interdependence

The Global Vaccination Action Plan was created by the World Health Organization and endorsed by the World Health Assembly in 2012. The plan, which is set from 2011 to 2020, is intended to "strengthen routine immunization to meet vaccination coverage targets; accelerate control of vaccine-preventable diseases with polio eradication as the first milestone; introduce new and improved vaccines and spur research and development for the next generation of vaccines and technologies."

== By country ==
=== Table ===
MA	Mandatory to all	MS	Mandatory to some	RA	Recommended to all	RS	Recommended to some	NO	Neither mandatory nor recommended to anyone

Countries	Strictest	BCG (Note: Bacillus Calmette–Guérin (tuberculosis) vaccine)	Chickenpox (Note: Chickenpox vaccine (varicella))	COVID-19 (Note: COVID-19 vaccine)	Diphteria (Note: Diphteria vaccine, included in the DPT vaccine)	Flu (Note: Influenza (flu) vaccine)	Hep A (Note: Hepatitis A vaccine)	Hep B (Note: Hepatitis B vaccine, included in the pentavalent and hexavalent vaccines)	HIB (Note: Hib vaccine, included in the pentavalent and hexavalent vaccines)	HPV (Note: Human papillomavirus vaccine)	Measles (Note: Measles vaccine, included in the MMR vaccine)	Meningo (Note: Meningococcus vaccine)	Mumps (Note: Mumps vaccine, included in the MMR vaccine)	Pertussis (Note: Pertussis (whooping cough) vaccine, included in the DPT, pentavalent and hexavalent vaccines)	Pneumo (Note: Pneumococcus vaccine)	Polio (Note: Polio vaccine, included in the hexavalent vaccine)	Rabies (Note: Rabies vaccines)	Rotavirus (Note: Rotavirus vaccine)	Rubella (Note: Rubella vaccine, included in the MMR vaccine)	Shingles (Note: Shingles vaccine (herpes zoster))	TBE (Note: Tick-borne encephalitis vaccine)	Tetanus (Note: Tetanus vaccine, included in the DPT, pentavalent and hexavalent vaccines)	Yellow fever (Note: Yellow fever vaccine)	Required for school	Required for welfare	Sources
Argentina																										
Australia	Yes for preschool in Vic, NSW, SA, WA	Yes																								
Austria		No	No																							
Belgium			No	No																						
Bosnia and Herzegovina																										
Brazil	No	Yes																								
Bulgaria			No	No																						
Canada			Yes for New Brunswick and Ontario	No																						
China																										
Costa Rica																										
Croatia			No	No																						
Cyprus			No	No																						
Czech Republic		No																								
Denmark		No	No																							
Ecuador																										
Egypt																										
Estonia		No	No																							
Fiji																										
Finland		No	No																							
France		No																								
Germany		No	No																							
Ghana																										
Greece		No	No																							
Hungary		No	No																							
Iceland		No	No																							
Indonesia	No																									
Ireland		No	No																							
Italy		No	No																							
Japan		No	No																							
Kazakhstan																										
Latvia		No	No																							
Lebanon																										
Liechtenstein		No	No																							
Lithuania		No	No																							
Luxembourg		No	No																							
Malawi																										
Malaysia																										
Malta			No	No																						
Federated States of Micronesia																										
Moldova																										
Morocco																										
Netherlands		No	No																							
New Zealand																										
North Macedonia																										
Norway		No	No																							
Oman																										
Pakistan																										
Philippines																										
Poland		No	No																							
Portugal		No	No																							
Romania		No	No																							
Russia		No	No																							
Saudi Arabia																										
Serbia			No	No																						
Singapore																										
Slovakia		No	No																							
Slovenia		No	No																							
South Africa																						No	No			
Spain		No	No																							
Sweden		No	No																							
Switzerland																							No	No		
Tajikistan																										
Tunisia																										
Turkey																										
Turkmenistan																										
Ukraine																			Yes							
United Kingdom		No	No																							
United States																					Yes					
Vatican City																										

=== Argentina ===
In December 2018, Argentina enacted a new vaccine policy requiring all persons who are medically able, both adults and children, to be vaccinated against specified diseases. Proof of vaccination is required to attend any level of school, file for a marriage license, and request any kind of government ID, including a passport or driver's license. The law requires the government to pay for all aspects of vaccinations and deems vaccination to be a national emergency; vaccines are exempt from internal and customs taxes.

=== Australia ===
Vaccine schedule

Vaccine Schedule for Australia: 1 April 2019
Infection	Birth	Months					Years							Preg Women
Infection	Birth	2	4	6	12	18	4	12–<13	14–<16	>15	>50	65+	70	Preg Women
Rotavirus		RV†	RV†											
Hepatitis A					HepA§ (Note: Queensland, Northern Territory, Western Australia, South Australia)	HepA§								
Hepatitis B	HepB†	DTaP-HepB-IPV-Hib†	DTaP-HepB-IPV-Hib†	DTaP-HepB-IPV-Hib†	DTaP-HepB-IPV-Hib‡			DTaP-HepB-IPV-Hib‡	DTaP-HepB-IPV-Hib‡ (Note: All people aged less than 20 years are eligible for free catch up vaccines.)					
Diphtheria		DTaP-HepB-IPV-Hib†	DTaP-HepB-IPV-Hib†	DTaP-HepB-IPV-Hib†	DTaP-HepB-IPV-Hib‡			Tdap†	DTaP-HepB-IPV-Hib‡					Tdap†
Pertussis		DTaP-HepB-IPV-Hib†	DTaP-HepB-IPV-Hib†	DTaP-HepB-IPV-Hib†	DTaP-HepB-IPV-Hib‡			Tdap†	DTaP-HepB-IPV-Hib‡					Tdap†
Tetanus		DTaP-HepB-IPV-Hib†	DTaP-HepB-IPV-Hib†	DTaP-HepB-IPV-Hib†	DTaP-HepB-IPV-Hib‡			Tdap†	DTaP-HepB-IPV-Hib‡					Tdap†
Polio		DTaP-HepB-IPV-Hib†	DTaP-HepB-IPV-Hib†	DTaP-HepB-IPV-Hib†	DTaP-HepB-IPV-Hib‡			DTaP-HepB-IPV-Hib‡	DTaP-HepB-IPV-Hib‡					
Haemophilus influenzae		DTaP-HepB-IPV-Hib†	DTaP-HepB-IPV-Hib†	DTaP-HepB-IPV-Hib†	DTaP-HepB-IPV-Hib‡			DTaP-HepB-IPV-Hib‡	DTaP-HepB-IPV-Hib‡					
Meningococcus					MenACWY†	MenACWY‡			MenACWY†	MenACWY‡				
Pneumococcus		PCV13†	PCV13†	PCV13#	PCV13†	PCV13‡								
Pneumococcus		PCV13†	PCV13†	PCV13§	PCV13†	PCV13‡								
Pneumococcus							PPSV23#			PPSV23#§	PPSV23§	PPSV23†		
Measles					MMR†	MMRV†	MMRV‡							
Mumps					MMR†	MMRV†	MMRV‡							
Rubella					MMR†	MMRV†	MMRV‡							
Varicella						MMRV†	MMRV‡							
Human papillomavirus								HPV x2†	HPV x2‡					
Influenza				IIV (yearly)†								IIV (yearly)†		
Influenza				IIV (yearly)#								IIV (yearly)†		
Influenza				IIV (yearly)§								IIV (yearly)†		
Herpes Zoster													ZVL	
† Recommended ages for everyone.; # Recommended ages for certain other high-risk groups.; ‡ Recommended ages for catch-up immunization.; § Recommended range of additional vaccinations for Aboriginals and Torres Strait Islanders.

In an effort to boost vaccination rates in Australia, the Australian Government decided, starting on 1 January 2016, certain benefits (such as the universal "Family Allowance" welfare payments for parents of children) would no longer be available for conscientious objectors of vaccination. Those with medical grounds for not vaccinating continue to receive such benefits. The policy is supported by a majority of Australian parents as well as the Australian Medical Association (AMA) and Early Childhood Australia. In 2014, about 97 percent of children under seven were vaccinated, although the number of conscientious objectors to vaccination had increased by 24,000 to 39,000 in the previous decade.

The government began the Immunise Australia Program to increase national immunization rates. They fund a number of different vaccinations for certain groups of people. The intent is to encourage the most at-risk populations to get vaccinated. The government maintains an immunization schedule.

In most states and territories, children can consent to vaccinations if they are judged Gillick competent; normally, this applies to children aged 15 or older. In South Australia, the Consent to Medical Treatment and Palliative Care Act 1995 allows children 16 and older to consent to medical treatment. Additionally, children under this age can be immunized if judged capable of informed consent. In New South Wales, children can consent to medical treatment at the age of 14.

When several COVID-19 vaccines were nearing completion in November 2020, Australian Prime Minister Scott Morrison announced that all international travelers who fly to Australia without proof of a COVID-19 vaccination would be required to quarantine at their own expense.

It is also lawful for workplaces in Australia to mandate vaccines. The legality of this was upheld in the Fair Work Commission case Kimber v Sapphire Coast Community Aged Care Ltd in 2021.

=== Austria ===
Austrian vaccine recommendations are developed by the National Vaccination Board (German: Nationales Impfgremium), which is part of the Federal Ministry of Social Affairs, Health, Care and Consumer Protection.

Children aged 14 and older can be vaccinated without parental consent.

=== Brazil ===
Vaccinating children has been mandatory in Brazil since 1975, when the federal government instituted the National Immunization Program. The compulsory character was written into law in 1990, in the Statute of Children and Adolescents (Art. 14, Para. 1). Parents in Brazil who don't take their children to be vaccinated run the risk of being fined or charged with negligence.

Vaccine schedule

Brazilian National Vaccination Schedule: 2019
Infection	Gestation	Birth	Months								Years					
Infection	Gestation	Birth	2	3	4	5	6	9	12	15	4	5	9	11	10–59	60+
Tuberculosis		BCG														
Leprosy		BCG														
Hepatitis A										HepA						
Hepatitis B		HepB	5V		5V		5V									
Diphtheria	DTPa		5V		5V		5V			DTP	DTP				dT	
Tetanus	DTPa		5V		5V		5V			DTP	DTP				dT	
Pertussis	DTPa		5V		5V		5V			DTP	DTP				dT	
Haemophilus influenzae			5V		5V		5V									
Polio			IPV		IPV		IPV			OPV	OPV					
Pneumococcus			10v		10v				10v							
Meningococcus				MenC		MenC			MenC					MenC		
Rotavirus			RV		RV											
Measles									MMR	MMRV						
Mumps									MMR	MMRV						
Rubella									MMR	MMRV						
Varicella										MMRV	VV					
Yellow fever								YF								
Human papillomavirus													HPV x2 (girls)	HPV x2 (boys)		
Flu	IIV						IIV (yearly)									IIV (yearly)

=== Canada ===
Vaccination in Canada is voluntary. While vaccination is generally required to attend school in Ontario and New Brunswick, there are exemptions given to those who are opposed.

Under the mature minor doctrine, minors capable of granting informed consent can be vaccinated without parental approval.

==== Alberta ====
Vaccine schedule

Alberta Vaccine Schedule: 2015
Infection	Months					Years			
Infection	2	4	6	12	18	4	10–13	15–17	65+
Hepatitis B						HepB			
Diphtheria	DTaP	DTaP	DTaP		DTaP	DTaP		Tdap	
Tetanus	DTaP	DTaP	DTaP		DTaP	DTaP		Tdap	
Pertussis	DTaP	DTaP	DTaP		DTaP	DTaP		Tdap	
Haemophilus influenzae	HIB	HIB	HIB		HIB				
Pneumococcus	PneuC13	PneuC13		PneuC13					
Polio	IPV	IPV	IPV		IPV	IPV			
Measles				MMRV		MMRV			
Mumps				MMRV		MMRV			
Rubella				MMRV		MMRV			
Varicella				MMRV		MMRV			
Meningococcus		MenC		MenC				MenC-ACYW	
Human papillomavirus							HPV	HPV (boys)	
Flu			IIV (yearly)						

==== British Columbia ====
Vaccine schedule

British Columbia Vaccine Schedule: 2015
Infection	Months					Years			
Infection	2	4	6	12	18	4	10–13	15–17	65+
Hepatitis B	HepB	HepB	HepB						
Rotavirus	RV	RV							
Diphtheria	DTaP	DTaP	DTaP			DTaP		Tdap	
Tetanus	DTaP	DTaP	DTaP			DTaP		Tdap	
Pertussis	DTaP	DTaP	DTaP			DTaP		Tdap	
Haemophilus influenzae	HIB	HIB	HIB		HIB				
Pneumococcus	PneuC13	PneuC13		PneuC13					
Polio	IPV	IPV	IPV		IPV	IPV			
Measles				MMR		MMRV			
Mumps				MMR		MMRV			
Rubella				MMR		MMRV			
Varicella						MMRV	VV		
Meningococcus	MenCCV			MenCCV					
Human papillomavirus							HPV (girls)		
Flu			IIV (yearly)						

==== New Brunswick ====
Vaccine schedule

New Brunswick Vaccine Schedule: 2015
Infection	Birth	Months					Years			
Infection	Birth	2	4	6	12	18	4	10–13	15–17	65+
Hepatitis B	HepB	HepB		HepB						
Diphtheria		DTaP	DTaP	DTaP		DTaP	DTaP		Tdap	
Tetanus		DTaP	DTaP	DTaP		DTaP	DTaP		Tdap	
Pertussis		DTaP	DTaP	DTaP		DTaP	DTaP		Tdap	
Haemophilus influenzae		HIB	HIB	HIB		HIB				
Pneumococcus		PneuC13	PneuC13		PneuC13					
Polio		IPV	IPV	IPV		IPV	IPV			
Measles					MMRV	MMRV				
Mumps					MMRV	MMRV				
Rubella					MMRV	MMRV				
Varicella					MMRV	MMRV				
Meningococcus					MenCCV				MenC-ACYW	
Human papillomavirus								HPV (girls)		
Flu				IIV (yearly)						

==== Ontario ====
Vaccine schedule

Ontario Vaccine Schedule: 2017
Infection	Months						Years		
Infection	2	4	6	12	15	18	4	10–13	15–17
Hepatitis B								HepB	
Rotavirus	RV	RV							
Diphtheria	DTaP	DTaP	DTaP			DTaP	DTaP		Tdap
Tetanus	DTaP	DTaP	DTaP			DTaP	DTaP		Tdap
Pertussis	DTaP	DTaP	DTaP			DTaP	DTaP		Tdap
Haemophilus influenzae	HIB	HIB	HIB			HIB			
Pneumococcus	PCV13	PCV13		PCV13					
Polio	IPV	IPV	IPV			IPV	IPV		
Measles				MMRV			MMRV		
Mumps				MMRV			MMRV		
Rubella				MMRV			MMRV		
Varicella				MMRV	VV		MMRV		
Meningococcus				MenC				MenC-ACYW	
Human papillomavirus								HPV (girls)	

==== Quebec ====
Vaccine schedule

Quebec Vaccine Schedule: 2019
Infection	Months					Years						
Infection	2	4	6	12	18	4–6	9	14–16	Adult	50	65	75
Hepatitis A							HepA					
Hepatitis B	HepB	HepB			HepB		HepB					
Rotavirus	RV	RV										
Diphtheria	DTaP	DTaP	DTaP		DTaP	Tdap		Tdap	Tdap	Tdap		
Tetanus	DTaP	DTaP	DTaP		DTaP	Tdap		Tdap	Tdap	Tdap		
Pertussis	DTaP	DTaP	DTaP		DTaP	Tdap		Tdap	Tdap	Tdap		
Haemophilus influenzae	HIB	HIB	HIB		HIB							
Pneumococcus	PCV10	PCV10		PCV10							PPV23	
Polio	IPV	IPV	IPV		IPV	IPV						
Measles				MMR	MMRV							
Mumps				MMR	MMRV							
Rubella				MMR	MMRV							
Varicella					MMRV	VV						
Meningococcus				MenCC				MenCC				
Human papillomavirus							HPV					
Flu			IIV	IIV	IIV							IIV (yearly)

=== China ===
China has passed the World Health Organization's (WHO) regulatory vaccine assessments, demonstrating that they adhere to international standards. The Chinese government's Expanded Program on Immunization (EPI) was created in 1978 and provides certain obligatory vaccines, named Category 1 vaccines, for free to all children up to 14 years of age. Initially, the vaccines consisted of Bacillus Calmette-Guérin (BCG) vaccine, oral polio vaccine (OPV), measles vaccine (MV) and diphtheria, tetanus and pertussis (DPT vaccine). By 2007, the vaccine list was expanded to include hepatitis A, hepatitis B, Japanese encephalitis, A + C meningococcal polysaccharide, mumps, Rubella, hemorrhagic fever, anthrax, and leptospirosis. Category 2 vaccines, such as the rabies vaccine, are private-sector, non-obligatory vaccines that are not included in neither EPI nor the government health insurance. Due to the privatized nature of Category 2 vaccines, these vaccinations are associated with low coverage rates.

Both the Changsheng Bio-Technology Co Ltd and the Wuhan Institute of Biological Products have been fined for selling ineffective vaccines. In December 2018, China enacted new laws imposing strict controls over the production and inspection of aspects of vaccine production from research, development, and testing through production and distribution.

=== Costa Rica ===
In November 2021, Costa Rica added COVID-19 to the list of infectious diseases required to be vaccinated against. The vaccine is mandatory for children between the ages of 5 and 18.

=== Finland ===
Vaccine schedule

Vaccination Schedule for Finland
Infection	Birth	Months						Years						
Infection	Birth	2	3	5	6	12	18	3	4	6	11–12	14–15	25	65+
Tuberculosis	BCG (Note: For specific at risk-groups only (to be given at the earliest age)))													
Rotavirus		RV	RV	RV										
Diphtheria			DTaP	DTaP		DTaP			DTaP			Tdap	Td (10‑yearly) (Note: Thereafter Td booster every 10 years with or without vaccination against poliomyelitis (IPV) in case of travel to endemic areas and when previous IPV dose was given more than 5 years before)	
Tetanus			DTaP	DTaP		DTaP			DTaP			Tdap	Td (10‑yearly)	
Pertussis			DTaP	DTaP		DTaP			DTaP			Tdap		
Polio			IPV	IPV		IPV			IPV					
Haemophilus influenzae			HIB	HIB		HIB								
Hepatitis B	HepB													
Pneumococcus			PCV10	PCV10		PCV10								PCV13 + PPSV23 (Note: Recommended but not free of charge for those over 65 years.)
Measles						MMR (Note: Vaccination can be given from 6 months of age in case of travel abroad. If vaccination starts before 12 months of age, 2 doses are recommended (14–18 months and 6 years) The temporary recommendation of giving measles at 12 months of age was made a permanent recommendation; ie. now MMR should be given from 12–18 months except if travelling abroad to measles infected countries when it can be given from 6 months on. In case MMR is given at 6–11 months, the child needs a second and third dose to complete the series.)				MMRV				
Mumps						MMR				MMRV				
Rubella						MMR				MMRV				
Varicella (Note: Varicella vaccination implemented from 1 September 2017. Catch-up to all those born on 1 January 2006 or after and with no history of varicella.)							VV			MMRV				
Human papillomavirus											HPV			
Influenza					IIV3 (Note: One or two doses administered depending on previous influenza vaccination history. Annual vaccination. IIV tri-or quadrivalent used as follows: IIV3 for all those 6–35 months. IIV4 with nonpreferential alternative to all those 24–35 months. IIV3 also recommended to medical risk group children from 36 months up.)									IIV3
Tick-borne encephalitis								TBE (Note: TBE vaccination for to those living permanently on the island of Åland)						

History
1960: Mumps vaccinations for military recruits.
1975: Measles vaccination for 1 year old children.
1975: Rubella vaccination for 11–13 years old girls and seronegative mothers.
1982: Two doses of MMR vaccination at 14–18 months and 6 years of age were introduced in the national childhood vaccination programme.
2009: Rotavirus vaccine introduced at 2, 3 and 5 months to all children (September 2009)
2010: PCV introduced at 3, 5 and 12 months of age to all children (September 2010).
2013: HPV vaccination of girls introduced
2017: Varicella vaccination introduced (1 September 2017) at 18 months, 6 years + catch-up of all born from 1 January 2006 or after with no history of varicella.
2020: HPV vaccination of boys introduced

=== France ===
Vaccine schedule

Vaccination Schedule for France
Infection	Months											Years						
Infection	0	1	2	4	6	11	12	13	15	16–18	23	2	5	6	11–13	25	45	65+
Tuberculosis	BCG†		BCG#															
Diphtheria			D†	D†		D†								D†	D†	d†		
Tetanus			TT†	TT†		TT†								TT†		TT†		
Pertussis			acP†	acP†		acP†								acP†		acp†		
Polio			IPV†	IPV†		IPV†								IPV†		IPV†		
Haemophilus influenzae			Hib†	Hib†		Hib†												
Hepatitis B	HepB†	HepB†	HepB†	HepB†	HepB†													
Pneumococcus			PCV†	PCV†		PCV†												
Meningococcus							MenC†											
Measles					MEAS†					MEAS†								
Mumps							MUMPS†			MUMPS†								
Rubella							RUMBE†			RUMBE†								
Human papillomavirus															HPV†			
Influenza																		TIV†
Herpes Zoster																		HZ†
† General Recommendation # Recommended for specific groups only. ‡ Catch-up

In France, the High Council of Public Health is in charge of proposing vaccine recommendations to the Minister of Health. Each year, immunization recommendations for both the general population and specific groups are published by the Institute of Epidemiology and Surveillance. Since some hospitals are granted additional freedoms, there are two key people responsible for vaccine policy within hospitals: the Operational physician (OP), and the Head of the hospital infection and prevention committee (HIPC). Mandatory immunization policies on BCG, diphtheria, tetanus, and poliomyelitis began in the 1950s and policies on Hepatitis B began in 1991. Recommended but not mandatory suggestions on influenza, pertussis, varicella, and measles began in 2000, 2004, 2004, and 2005, respectively. According to the 2013 INPES Peretti-Watel health barometer, between 2005 and 2010, the percentage of French people between 18 and 75 years old in favor of vaccination dropped from 90% to 60%.

Since 2009, France has recommended meningococcus C vaccination for infants 1–2 years old, with a catch up dosage up to 25 years later. French insurance companies have reimbursed this vaccine since January 2010, at which point coverage levels were 32.3% for children 1–2 years and 21.3% for teenagers 14–16 years old. In 2012, the French government and the Institut de veille sanitaire launched a 5-year national program to improve vaccination policy. The program simplified guidelines, facilitated access to vaccination, and invested in vaccine research. In 2014, fueled by rare health-related scandals, mistrust of vaccines became a common topic in the French public debate on health. According to a French radio station, as of 2014, three to five percent of kids in France were not given the mandatory vaccines. Some families may avoid requirements by finding a doctor willing to forge a vaccination certificate, a solution which numerous French forums confirm. However, the French State considers "vaccine refusal" a form of child abuse. In some instances, parental vaccine refusals may result in criminal trials. France's 2010 creation of the Question Prioritaire Constitutionelle (QPC) allows lower courts to refer constitutional questions to the highest court in the relevant hierarchy. Therefore, criminal trials based on vaccine refusals may be referred to the Cour de Cassation, which will then certify whether the case meets certain criteria.

In May 2015, France updated its vaccination policies on diphtheria, tetanus, acellular pertussis, polio, Haemophilus influenzae b infections, and hepatitis B for premature infants. As of 2015, while failure to vaccinate is not necessarily illegal, a parent's right to refuse to vaccinate his or her child is technically a constitutional matter. Additionally, children in France cannot enter schools without proof of vaccination against diphtheria, tetanus, and polio. French Health Minister, Marisol Touraine, finds vaccinations "absolutely fundamental to avoid disease," and has pushed to have trained pharmacists and doctors administer vaccinations. Most recently, the Prime Minister's 2015–2017 roadmap for the "multi-annual social inclusion and anti-poverty plan" includes free vaccinations in certain public facilities. Vaccinations within the immunization schedule are given for free at immunization services within the public sector. When given in private medical practices they are reimbursed at 65%.

=== Germany ===
Vaccine schedule

Vaccination Schedule for Germany
Infection	Weeks	Months								Years								
Infection	6	2	3	4	11	12	14	15	23	2	5–6	9	14	15	17	18–45	59	>60
Rotavirus	RV†	RV†	RV†															
Diphtheria		D†	D†	D†	D†			D‡		d‡	d†	d†				d†		
Tetanus		TT†	TT†	TT†	TT†			TT‡		TT‡	TT†	TT†				TT†		
Pertussis		acP†	acP†	acP†	acP†			acP‡		acP‡	acp†	acp†				acp†		
Polio		IPV†	IPV†	IPV†	IPV†			IPV‡		IPV‡		IPV†				IPV‡		
Haemophilus influenzae		Hib†	Hib†	Hib†	Hib†			Hib‡		Hib‡								
Hepatitis B		HepB†	HepB†	HepB†	HepB†			HepB‡		HepB‡								
Pneumococcus		PCV†	PCV†	PCV†	PCV†			PCV‡			Pnc#							PPSV23†
Meningococcus						MenC†				MenC‡								
Measles					MEAS†			MEAS†		MEAS‡						MEAS#		
Mumps					MUMPS†			MUMPS†		MUMPS‡								
Rubella					RUMBE†			RUMBE†		RUMBE‡								
Varicella					VAR†			VAR†		VAR‡								
Human papillomavirus												HPV†		HPV‡				
Influenza																		TIV†
Tick-borne Encephalitis						TBE#												
† General Recommendation # Recommended for specific groups only. ‡ Catch-up

In Germany, the Standing Committee on Vaccination (STIKO) is the federal commission responsible for recommending an immunization schedule. The Robert Koch Institute in Berlin (RKI) compiles data of immunization status upon the entry of children at school, and measures vaccine coverage of Germany at a national level. Founded in 1972, the STIKO is composed of 12–18 volunteers, appointed members by the Federal Ministry for Health for 3-year terms. Members include experts from many scientific disciplines and public health fields and professionals with extensive experience on vaccination. The independent advisory group meets biannually to address issues pertaining to preventable infectious diseases. Although the STIKO makes recommendations, immunization in Germany is voluntary and there are no official government recommendations. German Federal States typically follow the Standing Vaccination Committee's recommendations minimally, although each state can make recommendations for their geographic jurisdiction that extends beyond the recommended list. In addition to the proposed immunization schedule for children and adults, the STIKO recommends vaccinations for occupational groups, police, travelers, and other at risk groups.

Vaccinations recommendations that are issued must be in accordance with the Protection Against Infection Act (Infektionsschutzgesetz), which regulates the prevention of infectious diseases in humans. If a vaccination is recommended because of occupational risks, it must adhere to the Occupational Safety and Health Act involving Biological Agents. Criteria for the recommendation include disease burden, efficacy and effectiveness, safety, feasibility of program implementation, cost-effectiveness evaluation, clinical trial results, and equity in access to the vaccine. In the event of vaccination-related injuries, federal states are responsible for monetary compensation. Germany's central government does not finance childhood immunizations, so 90% of vaccines are administered in a private physician's office and paid for through insurance. The other 10% of vaccines are provided by the states in public health clinics, schools, or day care centers by local immunization programs. Physician responsibilities concerning immunization include beginning infancy vaccination, administering booster vaccinations, maintaining medical and vaccination history, and giving information and recommendations concerning vaccines.

Children aged 15 and over can legally consent to being vaccinated, even if their parents expressly object, provided the child gives the impression of being mature, informed, and capable of understanding the risks and benefits of their decision.

Beginning in March 2020, Germany made the measles vaccine compulsory for all children attending school or day care, as well persons employed at schools, day cares, and medical or community facilities.

=== Ghana ===
As of January 2022, COVID-19-vaccination is mandatory for staff and students of secondary and tertiary education, employees in all arms of government, health workers, security personnel, and commercial drivers.

=== India ===
Vaccine schedule

IAP Immunization Timetable: 2016
Infection	Birth	Months										Years		
Infection	Birth	1.5	2.5	3.5	6	9	9–12	12	15	16–18	18	2	4–6	10–12
Tuberculosis	BCG													
Polio	OPV				OPV	OPV							OPV	
Hepatitis B	HepB	HepB			HepB									
Rotavirus		RV	RV	RV										
Diphtheria		DTwP	DTwP	DTwP						DTwP			DTwP	Tdap
Tetanus		DTwP	DTwP	DTwP						DTwP			DTwP	Tdap
Pertussis		DTwP	DTwP	DTwP						DTwP			DTwP	Tdap
Haemophilus influenzae		HIB	HIB	HIB						HIB				
Pneumococcus		PCV	PCV	PCV					PCV					
Polio		IPV	IPV	IPV						IPV				
Measles						MMR			MMR				MMR	
Mumps						MMR			MMR				MMR	
Rubella						MMR			MMR				MMR	
Typhoid							TCV					TCV		
Hepatitis A								HepA			HepA			
Varicella									VV				VV	
Human papillomavirus														HPV (girls)

=== Ireland ===
In the Republic of Ireland, childhood vaccination (up to age 16) requires the consent of the parents. The Department of Health strongly recommend vaccinations.

=== Italy ===
Vaccine schedule

Vaccination Schedule for Italy
Infection	Birth	Months					Years		
Infection	Birth	3	5–6	11	13	15	5–6	11–18	65+
Diphtheria		D†	D†	D†			D†	d†	
Tetanus		TT†	TT†	TT†			TT†	TT†	
Pertussis		acP†	acP†	acP†			acP†	acp†	
Polio		IPV†	IPV†	IPV†			IPV†		
Haemophilus influenzae		Hib†	Hib†	Hib†					
Hepatitis B	HepB#	HepB†	HepB†	HepB†					
Pneumococcus		PCV†	PCV†	PCV†					
Meningococcus					MenC†			MenC‡	
Measles					MEAS†		MEAS†	MEAS‡	
Mumps					MUMPS†		MUMPS†	MUMPS‡	
Rubella					RUMBE†		RUMBE†	RUMBE‡	
Varicella								VAR†	
Human papillomavirus								HPV†	
Influenza									TIV†
† General Recommendation # Recommended for specific groups only. ‡ Catch-up

As aging populations in Italy bring a rising burden of age-related disease, the Italian vaccination system remains complex. The fact that services and decisions are delivered by 21 separate regional authorities creates many variations in Italian vaccine policy. There is a National committee on immunizations that updates the national recommended immunization schedule, with input from the ministry of health representatives, regional health authorities, national institute of health, and other scientific societies. Regions may add more scheduled vaccinations, but cannot exempt citizens from nationally mandated or recommended ones. For instance, a nationwide plan for eliminating measles and rubella began in 2001. Certain vaccinations in Italy are based on findings from the National Centre for Epidemiology, Surveillance and Health Promotion are also used to determine miscellaneous vaccination mandates.

Childhood vaccinations included in national schedules are guaranteed free of charge for all Italian children and foreign children who live in the country. Estimated insurance coverage for the required three doses of HBV-Hib-IPV vaccines is at least 95% when the child is two years old. Influenza is the only nationally necessary vaccine for adults, and is administered by general practitioners. To mitigate some public concerns, Italy currently has a national vaccine injury compensation program. Essentially, those who are ill or damaged by mandatory and recommended vaccinations may receive funding from the government as compensation. A 2010 evaluation of vaccine coverage, which covered the 2008 birth cohort, showed a slight decline in immunization insurance coverage rates of diphtheria, hepatitis B, polio, and tetanus after those specific vaccinations had been made mandatory. However, vaccination levels continued to pass the Italian government's goal of 95% outreach.

Aiming to integrate immunization strategies across the country and equitize access to disease prevention, the Italian Ministry of Health issued the National Immunization Prevention Plan (Piano Nazionale Prevenzione Vaccinale) in 2012. This plan for 2012–2014 introduced an institutional "life course" approach to vaccination to complement the Italian health policy agenda. HPV vaccine coverage increased well, and pneumococcal vaccine and meningococcal C vaccines faced positive public reception. However, both infant vaccine coverage rates and influenza immunization in the elderly have been decreasing. A 2015 government plan in Italy aimed to boost vaccination rates and introduce a series of new vaccines, triggering protests among public health professionals. Partially in response to the statistic that less than 86% of Italian children receive the measles shot, the National Vaccination Plan for 2016–18 (PNPV) increased vaccination requirements. For instance, nationwide varicella shots would be required for newborns. Under this plan, government spending on vaccines would double to €620 million annually, and children could be barred from attending school without proving vaccination. Although these implementations would make Italy a European frontrunner in vaccination, some experts questioned the need for several of the vaccines, and some physicians worried about the potential punishment they may face if they do not comply with the proposed regulations.

There were 5,000 cases of measles in 2017, up from 870 in 2016. This rise accounted for 29% of all those in the European Union. The law compelling children to have ten vaccinations to enroll at state schools came into effect in March 2018 but in August 2018 the Five Star Movement pushed legislation through the Italian Senate abolishing it. It did not pass the Chamber of Deputies but parents did not have to provide schools with a doctor's note to show their children have been vaccinated. By November 2018, the government had changed its stance because of the "measles emergency" and decided to uphold the obligation for children up to the age of 16, teachers and health professionals to be vaccinated. A midwife working at a hospital in central Italy was terminated for refusing vaccination.

=== Japan ===
Vaccine schedule

Japan Vaccine Schedule: January 2020
Infection	Act/ Order (Category)	Birth	Months							Years								
Infection	Act/ Order (Category)	Birth	2	3	6	12	24	36	60	≧5 (Note: Vaccines for measles and rubella (MR vaccine) can be received anytime from 5 y/o before 7 y/o, AND the time should be also between one year and one day before the first day of schooling (quote: "五歳以上七歳未満の者であって、小学校就学の始期に達する日の一年前の日から当該始期に達する日の前日までの間にあるもの".)	7>	7.5 (90 mo)	9	11	12 (Note: HPV for female students only. Vaccination can be started from the first day of school year within she turns 12, and until the last day of school year within she turns 16 (quote: "十二歳となる日の属する年度の初日から十六歳となる日の属する年度の末日までの間にある女子").)	13>	16	60–64 (Note: Age 60–64 with certain diseases: heart, kidney or respitory failures, or with an immune-related disorder due to HIV infection.) & 65+
Diphtheria	Act (A)			DTaP-IPV										DT				
Tetanus	Act (A)			DTaP-IPV										DT				
Pertussis	Act (A)			DTaP-IPV														
Polio	Act (A)			DTaP-IPV														
Measles	Act (A)					MR (1st)				MR (2nd)								
Rubella	Act (A)					MR (1st)				MR (2nd)								
Japanese encephalitis	Act (A)				Japanese encephalitis (1st)								Japanese encephalitis (2nd)					
Tuberculosis	Act (A)	BCG																
Haemophilus influenzae	Act (A)		Hib															
Pneumococcus	Act (A)		Pneumococcal															
Pneumococcus	Order (B)																	Pneumococcal
Human papillomavirus	Act (A)														HPV vaccine			
Smallpox	Order (A)	Not specified by the act or the order																
Varicella	Order (A)					Varicella												
Hepatitis B	Order (A)	Hep B																
Influenza	Order (B)																	Flu

Only in the legal term in Japan, citizens get old one day before their birthdays. If a person was born on January 1, 2020, and Immunization Act specifies vaccine against measles could be received from age 12 months to 24 months, vaccination shall be practiced between December 31, 2020, and December 31, 2021 (not between January 2021 and January 2022.) Some vaccinations are scheduled in line with the school year system, which starts from April 1 in Japan. As explained, those who are born on April 1 and on April 2 get old legally on March 31 and April 1, respectively. Thus, these two people are in different school years and thereby they may take vaccines in different calendar years.

Legal age counting system in Japan
Recipients	Birth	Months							Years							
Recipients	Birth	2	3	6	12	24	36	60	≧5 (Note: Vaccines for measles and rubella (MR vaccine) can be received anytime from 5 y/o before 7 y/o, AND the time should be also between one year and one day before the first day of schooling (quote: "五歳以上七歳未満の者であって、小学校就学の始期に達する日の一年前の日から当該始期に達する日の前日までの間にあるもの".)	7>	7.5 (90 mo)	9	11	12 (Note: HPV for female students only. Vaccination can be started from the first day of school year within she turns 12, and until the last day of school year within she turns 16 (quote: "十二歳となる日の属する年度の初日から十六歳となる日の属する年度の末日までの間にある女子").)	13>	16
Person A (Note: Starts elementary schooling from April 1, 2026)	Dec 31, 2019	Feb 29, 2020 (Note: 2020 is a leap year. Person B socially turns 2 months old on March 1, 2004. In the legal term, however, Person B's 2-month birthday is the day before March 1, 2004. Thus, It shall be February 29, 2004. There are no February 30 or 31 in 2020. As a result Person A and Person B have the same 2-month birthday.)	Mar 30, 2020	Jun 30, 2020	Dec 30, 2020	Dec 30, 2021	Dec 30, 2022	Dec 30, 2024	Apr 1, 2025	Mar 31, 2026	Jun 30, 2027	Dec 30, 2028	Dec 30, 2030	Apr 1, 2031	Dec 29, 2032	Mar 31, 2036
Person B	Jan 1, 2020	Feb 29, 2020	Mar 31, 2020	Jun 30, 2020	Dec 31, 2020	Dec 31, 2021	Dec 31, 2022	Dec 31, 2024	Apr 1, 2025	Mar 31, 2026	Jun 30, 2027	Dec 31, 2028	Dec 31, 2030	Apr 1, 2031	Dec 30, 2032	Mar 31, 2036
Person C	Apr 1, 2020	May 31, 2020	Jun 31, 2020	Sep 30, 2020	Mar 31, 2021	Mar 31, 2022	Mar 31, 2023	Mar 31, 2025	Apr 1, 2025	Mar 31, 2026	Sep 30, 2027	Mar 31, 2029	Mar 31, 2031	Apr 1, 2031	Mar 30, 2033	Mar 31, 2036
Person D (Note: Starts elementary schooling from April 1, 2027)	Apr 2, 2020	Jun 1, 2020	Jul 1, 2020	Oct 1, 2020	Apr 1, 2021	Apr 1, 2022	Apr 1, 2023	Apr 1, 2025	Apr 1, 2026	Mar 31, 2027	Oct 1, 2027	Apr 1, 2029	Apr 1, 2031	Apr 1, 2032	Mar 31, 2033	Mar 31, 2037

In Japan, there are three types of vaccination practices: Routine (scheduled); Temporary (ad-hoc); and Non-legal. Infections of the first two types are defined by Immunization Act (Japanese: 予防接種法) and its related cabinet order (Japanese: 予防接種法施行令). As of January 2020, sixteen infections in total are on the legal lists – fourteen are Category A diseases (vaccination is not mandatory but recommended to prevent pandemic), and two are Category B (not even recommended and only for a personal care purpose).

Compared to the global standard, Japanese vaccination policy is sometimes described by medical experts as the "Vaccine Gap." For instance, Japan is the only developed country that does not list mumps on the vaccine schedule. It's also noted that the government approval for new combination vaccines usually takes longer than other developed countries, such as the United States.

One reason behind the vaccine gap is that the government was sued several times for negligence of duty of care and for malpractice liabilities throughout the vaccination history. The lawsuit risks, particularly the 1992 Tokyo High Court's ruling on the MMR vaccine class action, impacted on law amendment. Vaccination is no longer mandatory as of 1994. As a result, vaccination rate declined in Japan. The rate of flu vaccination, for example, was 67.9% among schoolchildren in 1979 but dropped down to approximately 20% in 1998–1999. With the rapidly aging society issue, the decline among schoolchildren hit the elderly generation. In 1998–1999 season, deadly flu outbreak spread widely in nursing homes for the elderly as well as inpatients wards. The outbreak was followed by the 2001 amendment of Immunization Act to add flu vaccination for the elderly. As of February 2020, flu vaccination under the Act is in Category B (for a personal care purpose) only for the elderly. However, historical data sets suggest that flu vaccination for schoolchildren is also the key to take care of the elderly.

In addition to legal and social risk concerns, an issue of the decision-making process underlies the vaccine gap. Unlike the Advisory Committee on Immunization Practices (ACIP) in the United States, a centralized permanent advisory committee for vaccination policy was not organized in Japan until 2009, when a deadly flu outbreak struck the nation. Since the committee kick-off, however, the vaccine gap has been gradually improved.

HPV vaccine in Japan refers to the national history of human papillomavirus immunization policy, beginning with the vaccine's initial approval in 2009. It was incorporated into the routine immunization schedule in 2013. However, in June of that year, the Ministry of Health, Labour and Welfare (MHLW) suspended proactive recommendation due to reports of adverse events. Vaccination rates subsequently dropped below 1%. After years of scientific review, international pressure, and domestic advocacy, proactive recommendation was resumed in 2022.

=== Latvia ===
According to a 2011 publication in CMAJ: The notion of "mandatory" in Latvia differs from that of other nations. Latvia appears unique in that it compels health care providers to obtain the signatures of those who decline vaccination. Individuals have the right to refuse a vaccination, but if they do so, health providers have a duty to explain the health consequences.

Vaccines that are not mandatory are not publicly funded, so the cost for those must be borne by parents or employers, she adds. Funded vaccinations include tuberculosis, diphtheria, measles, hepatitis B, human papillomavirus for 12-year-old girls, and tick-borne encephalitis until age 18 in endemic areas and for orphans.

Beginning at age 14, minors can consent to vaccination in Latvia without parental permission.

=== Malawi ===
COVID-19 vaccination is mandatory for health workers, journalists, and other frontline staff starting 20 December 2021.

=== Malaysia ===
In Malaysia, mass vaccination is practised in public schools. The vaccines may be administered by a school nurse or a team of other medical staff from outside the school. All the children in a given school year are vaccinated as a cohort. For example, children may receive the oral polio vaccine in Year One of primary school (about six or seven years of age), the BCG in Year Six, and the MMR in Form Three of secondary school. Therefore, most people have received their core vaccines by the time they finish secondary school.

=== Mexico ===
Mexico has a multi-year program for immunisation of children. The immunisation of children is fully covered by the government. Mexico has an adverse events committee to monitor the adverse effects of vaccination as well as a standing technical advisory group on immunization.

The recommended vaccine schedule for children in Mexico contains vaccinations against 16 vaccine-preventable diseases. Vaccine doses administered in Mexico are usually valid in the United States. The immunization schedule for children in Mexico is as follows:

Vaccines
Name	Age of administration	Diseases prevented
BCG	at birth	Tuberculosis
Antihepatitis B	at birth, 2, 6 months	Hepatitis B
Rotarix	2,4 months	Rotavirus
Pneumococcal vaccine	2,4 months, 12 through 15 months	Pneumococcal pneumonia
Antihepatitis A	12, 18 months	Hepatitis A
Pentavalent vaccine	2,4,6,18 months	Haemophilus influenzae type B, Pertussis, Diphtheria, Tetanus, Polio
Varicella vaccine	12 months	Chicken pox
Triple viral SRP	12 months, 6 years	Measles, Mumps, Rubella
Influenza vaccine	6 through 59 months, 36 months through 9 years (high risk only)	Influenza
Human papillomavirus vaccine	11 through 12 years (3 doses, girls only)	Human Papillomavirus
DPT	4 through 6 years	Diphtheria, Pertussis, Tetanus
SR vaccine	12 years	Measles, Rubella
Sabin vaccine	2 doses per years, from 6 to 59 months of age in addition to prior 2 doses of IPV	Polio
Td	12 years	Tetanus

In addition, Vitamin A is offered to all children of one year of age enrolled in nurseries or children's rooms.

=== New Zealand ===
Vaccination schedule

New Zealand Immunization Schedule: 1 March 2023
Infection	Gestation	Birth	Weeks	Months				Years				
Infection	Gestation	Birth	6	3	5	12	15	4	11–12	13–25	45	65+
Tuberculosis		BCG# (Note: For children at high risk of tuberculosis)										
Rotavirus			RV	RV								
Diphtheria	Tdap		DTaP-HepB-IPV-Hib	DTaP-HepB-IPV-Hib	DTaP-HepB-IPV-Hib			DTaP-IPV	Tdap		Tdap	Tdap
Tetanus	Tdap		DTaP-HepB-IPV-Hib	DTaP-HepB-IPV-Hib	DTaP-HepB-IPV-Hib			DTaP-IPV	Tdap		Tdap	Tdap
Pertussis	Tdap		DTaP-HepB-IPV-Hib	DTaP-HepB-IPV-Hib	DTaP-HepB-IPV-Hib			DTaP-IPV	Tdap		Tdap	Tdap
Polio			DTaP-HepB-IPV-Hib	DTaP-HepB-IPV-Hib	DTaP-HepB-IPV-Hib			DTaP-IPV				
Hepatitis B		HepB + HBIG# (Note: For babies of Hepatitis B carrier mothers)	DTaP-HepB-IPV-Hib	DTaP-HepB-IPV-Hib	DTaP-HepB-IPV-Hib							
Haemophilus influenzae			DTaP-HepB-IPV-Hib	DTaP-HepB-IPV-Hib	DTaP-HepB-IPV-Hib		Hib					
Pneumococcus			PCV13	PCV13# (Note: For children at high risk of pneumococcal disease)	PCV13	PCV13						
Meningococcus				MenB	MenB	MenB				MenACWY + MenB# (Note: For adolescents and young adults in communal living environments (e.g. boarding schools and university halls of residence))		
Measles						MMR	MMR					
Mumps						MMR	MMR					
Rubella						MMR	MMR					
Varicella							VV		VV ‡ (Note: For children who have not previously received the varicella vaccine or had a varicella infection)			
Human papillomavirus									HPV9			
Herpes Zoster												HZ
Influenza	IIV					IIV# (yearly) (Note: For people who have certain chronic health conditions, have a history of serious respiratory illness in early childhood, or are receiving care for serious mental health conditions.)						IIV (yearly)
General Recommendation # Recommended for specific groups only. ‡ Catch-up

Minors aged 16 and older may consent to vaccination without parental approval.

=== Nigeria ===
Vaccine schedule

Nigerian National Vaccination Schedule:
Infection	Birth	Months						Years	
Infection	Birth	2	3	4	6	9	18	4	5
Tuberculosis	BCG								
Leprosy	BCG								
Hepatitis B	HepB	5V		5V	5V				
Diphtheria		5V		5V	5V		DTP		
Tetanus		5V		5V	5V		DTP		
Pertussis		5V		5V	5V		DTP		
Haemophilus influenzae		5V		5V	5V				
Polio	OPV	OPV	OPV	OPV			OPV	OPV	
Pneumococcus		PCV	PCV	PCV		PCV			
Meningococcus							MCV	MCV	
Yellow fever						YF			

In Nigeria, the Expanded Programme on Immunization (EPI), was introduced in 1978 to provide free immunization against polio, measles, diphtheria, whooping cough, tuberculosis, and yellow fever to Nigerian children less than two years old. This free immunization can be obtained at any primary healthcare provider in the country. The vaccines are usually administered by a government health care worker. They also conduct routine vaccination visits in schools where all the children in a given school are vaccinated.

=== Pakistan ===
Facing numerous minor polio epidemics, the Pakistani government has now ruled that polio vaccination is mandatory and indisputable. In a statement from Pakistani Police Commissioner Riaz Khan Mehsud, "There is no mercy, we have decided to deal with the refusal cases with iron hands. Anyone who refuses [the vaccine] will be sent to jail."

=== Panama ===
COVID-19 vaccination may become mandatory for government employees. Unvaccinated employees may be forced to take unpaid leave. Having completed the vaccine schedule for schoolchildren up to the child's age, is required for access to the government's main scholarship program.

=== Russia ===
As of 2019, immunization is voluntary in Russia. In May 2021, Russian President Vladimir Putin said that mandating COVID-19 vaccines would be "impractical and impossible."

=== Samoa ===
In the wake of a declared measles epidemic, Samoan authorities made vaccination against measles compulsory in November 2019.

=== Slovenia ===
According to a 2011 publication in CMAJ: Slovenia has one of the world's most aggressive and comprehensive vaccination programs. Its program is mandatory for nine designated diseases. Within the first three months of life, infants must be vaccinated for tuberculosis, tetanus, polio, pertussis, and Haemophilus influenza type B. Within 18 months, vaccines are required for measles, mumps, and rubella, and finally, before a child starts school, the child must be vaccinated for hepatitis B. While a medical exemption request can be submitted to a committee, such an application for reasons of religion or conscience would not be acceptable. Failure to comply results in a fine and compliance rates top 95%, Kraigher says, adding that for nonmandatory vaccines, such as the one for human papillomavirus, coverage is below 50%.

Mandatory vaccination against measles was introduced in 1968 and since 1978, all children receive two doses of vaccine with a compliance rate of more than 95%. For TBE, the vaccination rate in 2007 was estimated to be 12.4% of the general population in 2007. For comparison, in neighboring Austria, 87% of the population is vaccinated against TBE.

=== South Africa ===
In South Africa vaccination is voluntary.

The South African Vaccination and Immunisation Centre (SAVIC) began in 2003 as an alliance between the South African Department of Health, vaccine industry, academic institutions, and other stakeholders. SAVIC works with the WHO and the South African National Department of Health to educate, research, provide technical support, and advocate for country-wide vaccinations.

=== Spain ===
Vaccine schedule

Vaccination Schedule for Spain
Infection	Birth	Months					Years				
Infection	Birth	2	4	6	12	18	3–4	6	12	14	65+
Diphtheria		D†	D†	D†		D†		d†		d†	d†
Tetanus		TT†	TT†	TT†		TT†		TT†		TT†	TT†
Pertussis		acP†	acP†	acP†		acP†		acp†			
Polio		IPV†	IPV†	IPV†		IPV†					
Haemophilus influenzae		Hib†	Hib†	Hib†		Hib†					
Hepatitis B	HepB†	HepB†	HepB†								
Pneumococcus		PCV†	PCV†		PCV†						PPSV23†
Meningococcus		MenC†			MenC†				MenC†		
Measles					MEAS†		MEAS†				
Mumps					MUMPS†		MUMPS†				
Rubella					RUMBE†		RUMBE†				
Varicella									VAR†		
Human papillomavirus									HPV†		
Influenza											TIV†
† General Recommendation # Recommended for specific groups only. ‡ Catch-up

Spain's 19 autonomous communities, consisting of 17 Regions and two cities, follow health policies established by the Inter-Territorial Health Council that was formed by the National and Regional Ministries of Health. This Inter-Territorial Council is composed of representatives from each region and meets to discuss health related issues spanning across Spain. The Institute of Health Carlos III (ISCIIII) is a public research institute that manages biomedical research for the advancement of health sciences and disease preventions. The ISCIII may suggest the introduction of new vaccines into Spain's Recommended Health Schedule and is under direct control of the Ministry of Health. Although the Ministry of Health is responsible for the oversight of health care services, the policy of devolution divides responsibilities among local agencies, including health planning and programing, fiscal duties, and direct management of health services. This decentralization proposes difficulties in collecting information at the national level. The Inter-Territorial Council's Commission on Public Health works to establish health care policies according to recommendations by technical working groups via letters, meetings, and conferences. The Technical Working Group on Vaccines review data on vaccine preventable diseases and proposes recommendations for policies. No additional groups outside the government propose recommendations. Recommendations must be approved by the Commission of Public Health and then by the Inter-Territorial Council, at which point they are incorporated into the National Immunization Schedule.

The Spanish Association of Pediatrics, in conjunction with the Spanish Medicines Agency, outlines specifications for vaccination schedules and policies and provides a history of vaccination policies implemented in the past, as well as legislature pertaining to the public currently. Spain's Constitution does not mandate vaccination, so it is voluntary unless authorities require compulsory vaccination in the case of epidemics. In 1921, vaccination became mandatory for smallpox, and in 1944 the Bases Health Act mandated compulsory vaccination for diphtheria and smallpox, but was suspended in 1979 after the elimination of the threat of an epidemic. The first systematic immunization schedule for the provinces of Spain was established in 1975 and has continuously been updated by each autonomous community in regard to doses at certain ages and recommendation of additional vaccine not proposed in the schedule.

The 2015 schedule proposed the newest change with the inclusion of pneumococcal vaccine for children under 12 months. For 2016, the schedule plans to propose a vaccine against varicella in children at 12–15 months and 3–4 years. Furthermore, the General Health Law of 1986 echoes Article 40.2 from the Constitution guaranteeing the right to the protection of health, and states employers must provide vaccines to workers if they are at risk of exposure. Due to vaccination coverage in each Community, there is little anti-vaccine activity or opposition to the current schedule, and no organized groups against vaccines. The universal public health care provides coverage for all residents, while central and regional support programs extend coverage to immigrant populations. However, no national funds are granted to the Communities for vaccine purchases. Vaccines are financed from taxes, and paid in full by the Community government. Law 21 in Article 2.6 establishes the need for proper clinical documentation and informed consent by the patient, although written informed consent is not mandated in the verbal request of a vaccine for a minor. The autonomous regions collect data, from either electronic registries or written physician charts, to calculate immunization coverage.

=== Switzerland ===
The Swiss vaccination schedule and recommendations are developed by the Federal Vaccination Commission and the Federal Office of Public Health in collaboration with the cantons.

Minors aged 12 and older may consent to immunization with the Pfizer–BioNTech COVID-19 vaccine without parental approval.

=== Tanzania ===
According to the World Health Organization vaccination coverage in Tanzania was more than 90% in 2012. An Electronic Immunisation Register has been established, which permits online access to the medical records of mothers and infants, enabling vaccination teams in remote areas to operate more effectively, especially with nomadic people. It also helps to coordinate stock levels and order new supplies.

=== United Kingdom ===
Vaccine schedule

United Kingdom Vaccine Schedule: 2020
Infection	Months				Years				
Infection	2	3	4	12	2–10	3–4	12–13	13–15	16–18
Diphtheria	DTaP	DTaP	DTaP			DTaP		Td	
Tetanus	DTaP	DTaP	DTaP			DTaP		Td	
Pertussis	DTaP	DTaP	DTaP			DTaP			
Polio	IPV	IPV	IPV			IPV		IPV	
Haemophilus influenzae	HIB	HIB	HIB	HIB					
Meningococcus	MenB		MenB	MenB/C				MenACWY	
Rotavirus	RV	RV							
Pneumococcus		PCV		PCV					
Hepatitis B	HepB	HepB	HepB						
Measles				MMR		MMR			
Mumps				MMR		MMR			
Rubella				MMR		MMR			
Influenza					LAIV				
HPV							HPVx2		

In the United Kingdom, the purchase and distribution of vaccines is managed centrally, and recommended vaccines are provided for free by the NHS. In the UK, no laws require vaccination of schoolchildren.

Children aged 16 and 17 can consent to immunizations without parental consent. Under the Gillick test, children under 16 can consent to vaccination over parental objections if they demonstrate a mature understanding of the ramifications of the procedure.

=== United States ===
Vaccine schedule

Vaccine Schedule for the United States: 2020
Infection	Birth	Months									Years										
Infection	Birth	1	2	4	6	9	12	15	18	19–23	2–3	4–6	7–10	11–12	13–15	16	17–18	19–26	27–49	50–64	65+
Hepatitis B	HepB†	HepB†		HepB‡	HepB†					HepB‡								HepB x2–3#			
Rotavirus			RV†	RV†	RV†																
Diphtheria			DTaP†	DTaP†	DTaP†	DTaP‡		DTaP†		DTaP‡		DTaP†	Tdap‡	Tdap†	Tdap‡			Td or Tdap (every 10 years)†			
Tetanus			DTaP†	DTaP†	DTaP†	DTaP‡		DTaP†		DTaP‡		DTaP†	Tdap‡	Tdap†	Tdap‡			Td or Tdap (every 10 years)†			
Pertussis			DTaP†	DTaP†	DTaP†	DTaP‡		DTaP†		DTaP‡		DTaP†	Tdap‡	Tdap†	Tdap‡			Td or Tdap (every 10 years)†			
Haemophilus influenzae			Hib†	Hib†	Hib†	Hib‡	Hib†		Hib‡				Hib#					Hib x1–3#			
Polio			IPV†	IPV†	IPV†					IPV‡		IPV†	IPV‡								
Pneumococcus			PCV13†	PCV13†	PCV13†	PCV13‡	PCV13†		PCV13‡				PCV13#					PCV13#			PCV13§
Pneumococcus											PPSV23#							PPSV23 x1–2#			PPSV23†
Influenza					IIV (yearly)†						IIV or LAIV (yearly)†										
Measles					MMR#		MMR†		MMR‡			MMR†	MMR‡					MMR x1–2‡			
Mumps					MMR#		MMR†		MMR‡			MMR†	MMR‡					MMR x1–2‡			
Rubella					MMR#		MMR†		MMR‡			MMR†	MMR‡					MMR x1–2‡			
Varicella							VAR†		VAR‡			VAR†	VAR‡					VAR x1–2‡		VAR 2x#	
Hepatitis A					HepA#		HepA x2†				HepA‡							HepA x2–3#			
Meningococcus			MenACWY#											MenACWY†	MenACWY‡	MenACWY†	MenACWY‡	MenACWY x1–2#			
Meningococcus														MenB x2–3#							
Meningococcus																	MenB§				
Human papillomavirus													HPV#	HPV x2–3†	HPV‡			HPV‡	HPV§		
Herpes Zoster																				RZV or ZVL†	
† Range of recommended ages for everyone. See references for more details.; # Range of recommended ages for certain high-risk groups. See references for more details.; ‡ Range of recommended ages for catch-up immunization or for people who lack evidence of immunity (e.g., lack documentation of vaccination or have no evidence of prior infection). (Note: CDC provides more detailed information in catch-up immunizations.); § Recommended vaccination based on shared clinical decision-making.

In the United States, the Advisory Committee on Immunization Practices makes scientific recommendations regarding vaccines and vaccination schedules that the federal government, state governments, and private health insurance companies generally follow. See Vaccination schedule for the schedule recommended in the United States.

As of 2025, all states in the U.S. except for Idaho mandate immunizations for children to enroll in public school, but various exemptions are available depending on the state. All states have exemptions for people who have medical contraindications to vaccines, all states except for California, Maine, Mississippi, New York, and West Virginia (as directed by its Board of Education) allow religious exemptions, and sixteen states allow parents to cite personal, conscientious, philosophical, or other objections.

An increasing number of parents are using religious and philosophical exemptions: researchers have cited this increased use of exemptions as contributing to loss of herd immunity within these communities, and hence an increasing number of disease outbreaks.

Of the 49 states with existing immunization requirements for public school, all of them require DTaP (diphtheria-tetanus-pertussis), MMR (measles-mumps-rubella), Polio, Tdap (tetanus-diphtheria-pertussis; secondary school only) and Varicella (chickenpox) vaccines for school attendance. Additionally, 46 states require the Hepatitis B vaccine, 34 states require the Meningococcal vaccine, and 18 require the Hepatitis A vaccine; Rhode Island, Virginia, and Hawaii also require the HPV vaccine (human papillomavirus; secondary school only).

The American Academy of Pediatrics (AAP) advises physicians to respect the refusal of parents to vaccinate their child after adequate discussion, unless the child is put at significant risk of harm (e.g., during an epidemic, or after a deep and contaminated puncture wound). Under such circumstances, the AAP states that parental refusal of immunization constitutes a form of medical neglect and should be reported to state child protective services agencies. Several states allow minors to legally consent to vaccination over parental objections under the mature minor doctrine.

Immunizations are compulsory for military enlistment in the U.S. However, exceptions exist, but may be determined by an uneven process. The suppression of religious exemptions to the military COVID-19 vaccination mandate was successfully proven by members of the Air Force and overturned in the Sixth Circuit federal court of appeals in September 2022, when evidence was presented that more than 99% of requests for religious exceptions were systematically denied approval, though other kinds of exemption requests were more often granted. The judge had previously awarded class action status to the case, extending the suit to cover an estimated more than 12,000 joint plaintiffs.

All vaccines recommended by the U.S. government for its citizens are required for green card applicants. This requirement stirred controversy over related costs when, in July 2008, it was applied to the HPV vaccine. In addition, the 13 other required vaccines prevent highly contagious diseases communicable through the respiratory route, while HPV is spread only through sexual contact. In November 2009, this requirement was canceled.

Though the federal guidelines do not require written consent to receive a vaccination, they do require doctors give the recipients or legal representatives a Vaccine Information Statement (VIS). Specific informed consent laws are made by the states.

==== Schools ====
The United States has a long history of school vaccination requirements. The first school vaccination requirement was enacted in the 1850s in Massachusetts to prevent the spread of smallpox. The school vaccination requirement was put in place after the compulsory school attendance law caused a rapid increase in the number of children in public schools, increasing the risk of smallpox outbreaks. The early movement towards school vaccination laws began at the local level including counties, cities, and boards of education. By 1827, Boston had become the first city to mandate that all children entering public schools show proof of vaccination. In addition, in 1855 the Massachusetts General Court had established its own statewide vaccination requirements for all students entering school, this influenced other states to implement similar statewide vaccination laws in schools as seen in New York in 1862, Connecticut in 1872, Pennsylvania in 1895, and later the Midwest, South, and the Western United States. By 1963, 20 states had school vaccination laws.

These vaccination laws resulted in political debates throughout the United States, as those opposed to vaccination sought to repeal local policies and state laws. An example of this political controversy occurred in 1893, in Chicago, where less than ten percent of the children were vaccinated, despite the twelve-year-old state law. Resistance was seen at the local level of the school district as some local school boards and superintendents opposed the state vaccination laws, leading the state board health inspectors to examine vaccination policies in schools. Resistance proceeded during the mid-1900s and in 1977 a nationwide Childhood Immunization Initiative was developed with the goal of increasing vaccination rates among children to ninety percent by 1979. During the two-year period of observation, the initiative reviewed the immunization records of more than 28 million children and vaccinated children who had not received the recommended vaccines.

In 1922, the constitutionality of childhood vaccination was examined in the Supreme Court case Zucht v. King. The court decided that a school could deny admission to children who failed to provide a certification of vaccination for the protection of the public health. In 1987, there was a measles epidemic in Maricopa County, Arizona, and Maricopa County Health Department v. Harmon examined the arguments of an individual's right to education over the state's need to protect against the spread of disease. The court decided that it is prudent to take action to combat the spread of disease by denying unvaccinated children a place in school until the risk for the spread of measles had passed.

Schools in the United States require an updated immunization record for all incoming and returning students. While all states require an immunization record, this does not mean all students must get vaccinated. Exemptions are determined at a state level. In the United States, exemptions take one of three forms: medical, in which a vaccine is contraindicated because of a component ingredient allergy or existing medical condition; religious; and personal philosophical opposition.

Until 2015, only Mississippi and West Virginia did not permit religious exemptions. However, this changed after California removed personal and religious exemptions with the passage of California Senate Bill 277. This is the first time an immunization exemption was removed by a state legislature. The bill was prompted by the 2014 Disneyland measles outbreak and low levels of vaccination in pockets of California, with some schools having vaccination rates below 60%. Despite the bill receiving support by the California Medical Association, as well as by the American Academy of Pediatrics' California affiliate, opposition to the bill had been characterized as "possibly the most strident outpouring of political dissent in recent memory." After the 2019 measles outbreak, the state legislatures of New York (2019), Maine (2019, upheld by voters in a 2020 referendum), and Connecticut (2021) removed their religious exemptions.

Throughout the 2020s, some states have loosened their immunization policies for schools. In July 2023, Mississippi started recognizing religious exemptions at the order of a judge, and in January 2025, West Virginia governor Patrick Morrisey issued an executive order allowing religious exemptions in the state, though the order has not been enforced by the state's Board of Education. In April 2025, Idaho became the first and only state to remove immunization requirements for schools after the passage of Senate Bill 1210.

Research studies have found a correlation between the rise of vaccine-preventable diseases and non-medical exemptions from school vaccination requirements, however, mandatory vaccination requirements for attending public schools have received criticism. Parents say that vaccine mandates to attend public schools prevent one's right to choose, especially if the vaccinations could be harmful. Some people believe being forced to get a vaccination could cause trauma, and may lead to not seeking medical care/attention ever again. In the constitutional law, some states have the liberty to withdraw to public health regulations, which includes mandatory vaccination laws that threaten fines. Certain laws are being looked at for immunization requirements, and are trying to be changed, but cannot succeed due to legal challenges. After California removed non-medical exemptions for school entrance, lawsuits were filed arguing for the right for children to attend school regardless of their vaccination history, and to suspend the bill's implementation altogether. However, all such lawsuits ultimately failed.

As of 2022, 300 American colleges and universities mandate that their students receive a COVID-19 booster. A study in the Journal of Medical Ethics concludes that the cost of these mandates likely outweigh the benefits. For example, to prevent one COVID hospitalization over a 6-month period, 31,000 to 42,000 adults in that age group would have to get a third mRNA booster; and those boosters will result in at least 18 "serious adverse events" (SAEs) for that single prevented hospitalization.

== See also ==
- World Immunization Week
- Vaccination requirements for international travel
- Vaccine law
