= Encephalitis vaccine =

Encephalitis vaccine may refer to:

- Tick-borne encephalitis vaccine
- Japanese encephalitis vaccine
