= CRM197 =

Clinical data
- Other names: Corynebacterium diphtheriae CRM197 protein

Identifiers
- CAS Number: 1272033-67-6 600173-37-3 (no sequence)
- UNII: 08VC9WC084

Chemical and physical data
- Molar mass: 58.4 kD

CRM197 is a non-toxic mutant of diphtheria toxin, currently used in certain vaccines as a carrier protein for polysaccharides and haptens to make them immunogenic.

There is some dispute about the toxicity of CRM197, with a 2008 study finding that it is toxic to yeast cells and some mammalian cell lines.

== Description ==
CRM197 is a genetically detoxified form of diphtheria toxin. A single mutation at position 52, substituting glutamic acid for glycine, causes the ADP-ribosyltransferase activity of the native toxin to be lost. The structural basis for the lack of CRM197 toxicity has recently been elucidated. CRM197 is widely used as a carrier protein for conjugate vaccines. A potential advantage of CRM197 over toxoided proteins is that, because it is genetically detoxified, it retains its full complement of lysine amines for conjugation. There is also evidence suggesting that, compared with tetanus toxoid, there is less carrier-induced suppression of the immune response, especially when there are many individual polysaccharides linked to the same carrier protein. A summary of the uses and properties of CRM197 has been published. CRM197, like diphtheria toxin, is a single polypeptide chain of 535 amino acids (58.4 kDa) consisting of two subunits (linked by disulfide bridges).

== Manufacturing ==
The gene for CRM197 has been cloned into Corynebacterium diphtheriae, the bacterium that produces the native toxin. Like the wild type toxin, CRM197 is expressed as a secreted protein at relatively low yields (typically <100 mg/L). Corynebacterium expressed CRM197 is available from several sources, including List Laboratories and Sigma-Aldrich. The low yield and high cost of commercially available native CRM197 has led to efforts to produce CRM197 in other bacteria but this has proven a difficult task until recently.

Three companies have succeeded at manufacturing CRM197 as a recombinant protein. Primrose Bio, Inc, a Ligand Pharmaceuticals Incorporated spin out formed in 2023 from the merger of its subsidiary Pelican Technology Holdings, Inc. (Pelican) with Primordial Genetics, Inc., is the San Diego–based developer of the Pfenex Expression Technology™ production platform, and produces the only commercial CRM197 used in licensed vaccines. Primrose Bio produces ("PeliCRM197™") in India at the Serum Institute of India Pune using Pseudomonas fluorescens and various proprietary expression technologies for high yield. Primrose Bio and Serum Institute of India are collaborating to develop a multi-antigen vaccine using Primrose's Pfenex Expression Technology. Fina BioSolutions LLC of Rockville, Maryland has achieved multi-gram/L expression of CRM197 in E. coli (“EcoCRMTM”) as an intracellular, properly folded soluble protein. Fina Biosolutions currently provides the protein for pre-clinical use. Recombinant CRM197 is also made in low-mutation Clean Genome® E. coli by Scarab Genomics LLC where transport of CRM197 into the bacterial cell periplasm enhances its stability and proper folding.

== Uses ==
CRM197 is used as a carrier protein in a number of approved conjugate vaccines. Hibtiter™, a vaccine to protect against Haemophilus influenzae type b, approved by the FDA in 1990, was the first conjugate vaccine to use CRM197 (the vaccine was discontinued in 2007). Pfizer's Prevnar, which in 2000 became the first pneumococcal conjugate vaccine to gain FDA approval, comprises polysaccharides from pneumococcal serotypes conjugated to CRM197. A larger number of clinical and pre-clinical conjugate vaccines using CRM197 as the carrier protein are being evaluated. A further example of a vaccine currently in use that is a CRM197 conjugate is the meningitis ACWY vaccine, Menveo, produced by GlaxoSmithKline. In addition, CRM197 made in Primrose Bio's Pfenex Expression Technology™ platform is used in six products including Merck’s CAPVAXIVE and VAXNEUVANCE® , Jazz Pharmaceuticals’ RYLAZE® , Alvogen’s Teriparatide Injection, and Serum Institute of India’s Pneumosil® and MenFive® vaccines.

CRM197 possesses a binding site for EGF receptor heparin-binding epidermal growth factor-like growth factor (HB-EGF), a member of the EGF family. As this receptor is overexpressed on cancer cells, there have been efforts to use CRM197 as an anti-cancer therapy. The cancer immunotherapy company Imugene reported dramatic improvements in antibody titers from its B cell peptide cancer immunotherapy targeting HER2 when it used CRM197 as a carrier protein.[5]

CRM197 is being evaluated as a potential drug delivery fusion protein. The Swiss-based Turing Pharmaceuticals is working on CRM197 fusion constructs with therapeutic proteins of up to 1,000 amino acids in length.[6]

Preclinical studies have shown that CRM197 is also suitable for conjugation and presentation of peptide epitopes, a vaccinal approach that could have applications in Streptococcal infection, cancer, or Alzheimer's disease therapy.

== History ==
In 1971 Tsuyoshi Uchida, in the laboratory of Alwin Pappenheimer at Harvard, used nitroguanidine to create mutants of diphtheria toxin, which were called Cross Reacting Materials, or CRMs. One of these mutants, called CRM197, interested researchers because its lack of toxicity suggested a better starting material for diphtheria vaccine than the wild-type protein, and the protein was found to enhance the immunogenicity of bacterial polysaccharides. The pharmaceutical company Wyeth took advantage of this immunogenicity in the 1990s when it conjugated seven polysaccharides from Streptococcus pneumoniae to CRM197 to create the original Prevnar vaccine which was FDA approved in February 2000. A 13-polysaccharides Prevnar was FDA-approved in 2010. The meningococcal vaccine Menveo, from Novartis, is four Neisseria meningitidis polysaccharides plus CRM197. This vaccine gained FDA approval in 2010.
