= Christian Kunz =

Austrian virologist

- Born: October 13, 1927; Linz, Austria
- Died: April 12, 2020 (aged 92)
- Known for: Development of tick-borne encephalitis vaccine
- Awards: Medal of Honour in Gold of the Federal Capital Vienna (1988), Loeffler Frosch Medal from the international Society for Virology (2006)
- Scientific career
- Fields: Virology
- Workplaces: University of Vienna, Rockefeller Laboratories, Institute of Virology in Vienna

Christian Kunz (13 October 1927 – 12 April 2020) was an Austrian virologist known for his work on the development of vaccines against tick-borne encephalitis, and his contributions to viral diagnostics and medical virology in Austria and Europe.

== Early life and education ==
Kunz was born in Linz, Austria, on 13 October 1927. He studied medicine in Vienna and Innsbruck, and obtained his doctorate in 1954.

== Career ==
Kunz began his career as an unpaid visiting doctor and then a research assistant at the Hygiene Institute of the University of Vienna.

In 1961–62, Kunz worked at the Rockefeller Laboratories in New York, alongside prominent virologists such as Max Theiler, who had won the Nobel Prize in Physiology or Medicine in 1951 for developing the yellow fever vaccine.

In Vienna, Kunz led a new virus department at the Hygiene Institute, focusing on arboviruses, such as tick-borne encephalitis. He developed innovative diagnostic techniques, studied the virus's structure, immunogenicity, and epidemiology.

In 1971, Kunz became the director of the newly-established Institute of Virology at the Medical Faculty, University of Vienna. His research focused on arboviruses and flaviviruses, including their structure, genetics, and molecular separation and diagnostic methods.

=== Development of tick-borne encephalitis vaccine ===
In 1972, Kunz began collaborating with the Microbiological Research Establishment (MRE) Porton Down in the UK, which was involved in defensive biological research including vaccine development against pathogens like Japanese encephalitis virus and the louping-ill virus, closely related to tick-borne encephalitis.

At Porton Down, the veterinary microbiologist James Keppie led development into a tick-borne encephalitis vaccine, based on the Neudörfl strain of the TBE virus provided by Kunz.

Kunz and his colleague Hans Hoffmann first tested the new vaccine on each other, before leading trials in volunteers in Austria. After the trial was successful, public vaccination campaigns began. The vaccine significantly reduced tick-borne encephalitis cases in Austria.

== Legacy and Recognition ==
Kunz earned the Medal of Honour in Gold of the Federal Capital Vienna in 1988, and the Loeffler Frosch Medal from the international Society for Virology in 2006. He was also a founding member and chairman of the European Group for Rapid Virus Diagnosis, advancing virus diagnostics.
