= Kimber v Sapphire Coast Community Aged Care Ltd =

Decision by the Australian workplace tribunal

- Court: Fair Work Commission
- Full case name: Jennifer Kimber v Sapphire Coast Community Aged Care Ltd
- Decided: 27 September 2021
- Citation: [2021] FWCFB 6015

Case history
- Prior action: Kimber v Sapphire Coast Community Aged Care Ltd [2021] FWC 1818

Case opinions
- Majority: Vice President Hatcher, Commissioner Riordan
- Dissent: Deputy President Dean

Kimber v Sapphire Coast Community Aged Care Ltd was a 2021 decision by the full bench of the Fair Work Commission. It held that it was lawful for an employer to fire an employee on the basis of their refusal to receive vaccination for influenza.

== Background ==
Jennifer Kimber was a receptionist at Sapphire Coast Community Aged Care who refused to comply with a direction to receive a vaccine for influenza. Following this, Sapphire Coast Community Aged Care dismissed Kimber, which led to Kimber filing a claim for unfair dismissal.

=== Previous vaccinations ===
Kimber had received a flu vaccine in 2015 with no issue, but claimed to suffer an adverse reaction in 2016. Following this incident, evidence suggested that Kimber did not see a doctor, take time off from work, or tell management about her purported 'severe allergic reaction' to the vaccine. The only knowledge management had of Kimber's condition was that of comments she had made to other members of staff about seeing a naturopath for skin problems.

Following the alleged adverse reaction in 2016, Kimber did not receive a flu vaccine for three years following the incident. In 2021, due to the COVID-19 pandemic, this became a matter of contention.

=== Insufficient vaccination exemption evidence provided by Kimber ===
At the beginning of the COVID-19 pandemic, the New South Wales government introduced laws that required all aged care workers to receive a flu vaccination if it was available to them. Sapphire required staff members to get vaccinated or provide proof of a valid exemption in the form of a letter from their General Practitioner (GP) or specialist. Kimber did not do this; instead, she provided a letter, riddled with typos, from a traditional Chinese medicine practitioner. This letter included insufficient references to Kimber's alleged adverse reaction, and was deemed to not be founded on understandings of medical science. As such, Sapphire required further documentation from Kimber, who then supplied a letter of support from a GP, whom Kimber had no evidence of consulting with prior to April 2020. It was found that the letter was based on assertions made by Kimber, rather than on an assessment of Kimber's condition.

Due to the letter being insufficient, Kimber took carer's leave in hopes that the flu vaccine mandate would be temporary. In this time, she sent a letter to the CEO of Sapphire, indicating that she would like a number of concerns addressed before she consulted with an immunologist. These concerns suggested that her objection to receiving the influenza vaccination extended beyond her purported adverse injury.

=== Termination of employment ===
At the expiry of the March order, Kimber intended to return to work at Sapphire on a reduced basis.

The NSW government, however, made a second order of a similar nature to the one made in March that prevented Kimber from returning. Sapphire then sent an email to Kimber, indicating that they may have no other choice but to terminate her contract of employment with them, as her refusal to get vaccinated prevents her from working her required hours. The correspondence also required her to attend a phone meeting with her manager so she could show cause as to why her employment with Sapphire should not be terminated. The following day, Kimber returned to the Sapphire and was escorted off the premises; she claimed that she had not seen the email.

Kimber returned to the GP she had seen previously and requested him to write a letter of support, as well as filling out the form now required by the June order.

The CEO rejected Kimber's reasons for exemption, based on the information provided in the Australian Immunisation Handbook and the advice provided in a press release by the Chief Medical Officer. He further stated, that, even if Kimber's exemptions were valid, she would still be unable to perform her duties as required. As such, Sapphire called Kimber and sent a letter to notify her that she had been dismissed. Following this, Kimber filed a claim for unfair dismissal.

== Public misconception ==
The case garnered significant public attention, with many individuals wrongfully believing that COVID-19 vaccine mandates were unlawful, due to the dissenting opinion of Deputy President Dean.
