= Pneumococcal polysaccharide vaccine =

Pneumonia vaccine

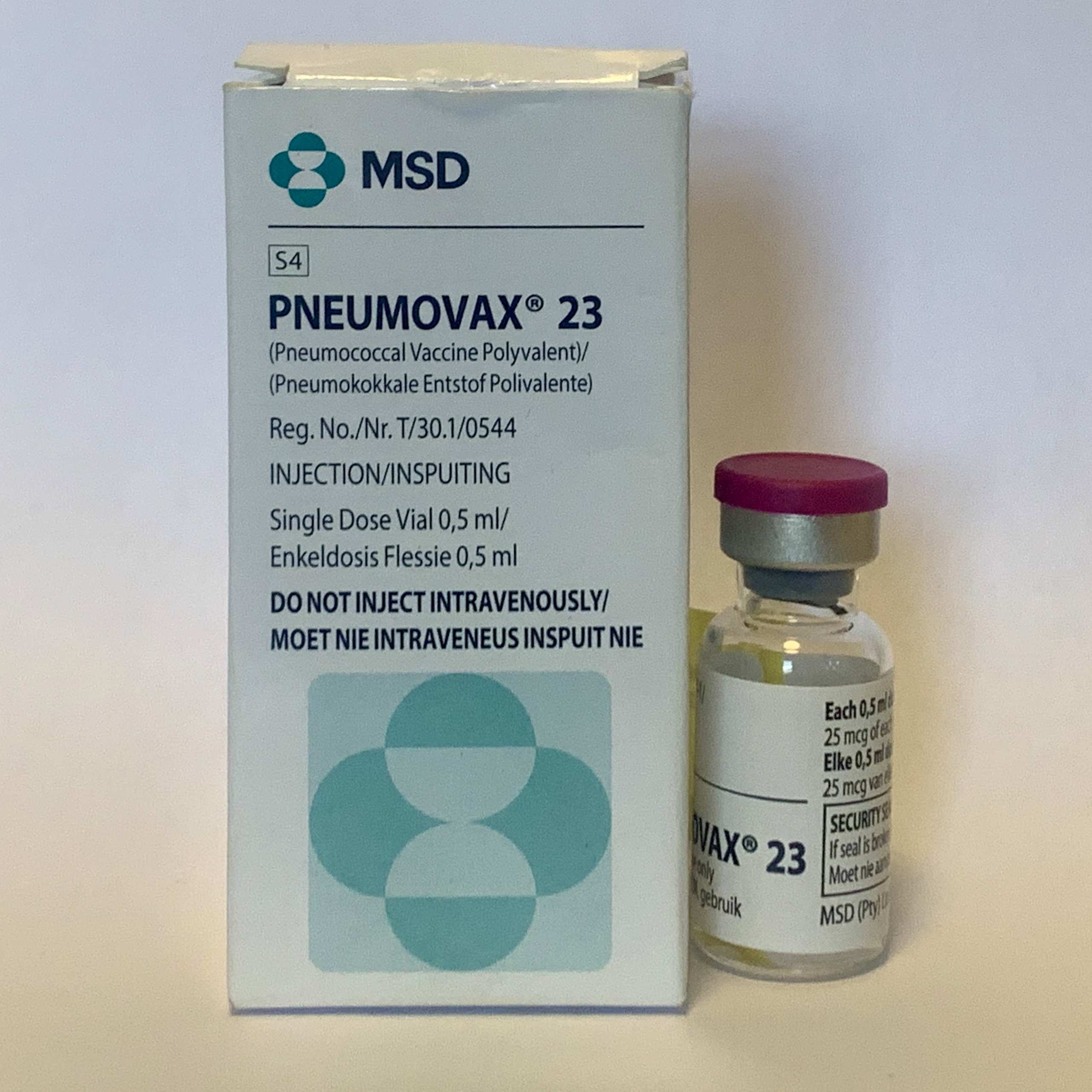

Vaccine description
- Target: 23 serotypes of Streptococcus pneumoniae
- Vaccine type: Polysaccharide

Clinical data
- Trade names: Pneumovax 23
- Other names: PPSV, PPV-23, PPSV23
- AHFS/Drugs.com: Monograph
- MedlinePlus: a607022
- License data: US DailyMed: Pneumococcal vaccine polyvalent
- Pregnancy category: AU: B2
- Routes of administration: Intramuscular
- ATC code: J07AL01 (WHO)

Legal status
- Legal status: US: ℞-only

Identifiers
- ChemSpider: none
- KEGG: D08776

Pneumococcal polysaccharide vaccine, sold under the brand name Pneumovax 23, is a pneumococcal vaccine that is used for the prevention of pneumococcal disease caused by the 23 serotypes of Streptococcus pneumoniae contained in the vaccine as capsular polysaccharides. It is given by intramuscular or subcutaneous injection.

The polysaccharide antigens were used to induce type-specific antibodies that enhanced opsonization, phagocytosis, and killing of Streptococcus pneumoniae (pneumococcal) bacteria by phagocytic immune cells. The pneumococcal polysaccharide vaccine is widely used in high-risk adults.

First used in 1945, the tetravalent vaccine was not widely distributed, since its deployment coincided with the discovery of penicillin. In the 1970s, Robert Austrian championed the manufacture and distribution of a 14-valent pneumococcal polysaccharide vaccine. This evolved in 1983 to a 23-valent formulation (PPSV23). A significant breakthrough affecting the burden of pneumococcal disease was the licensing of a protein conjugate heptavalent vaccine (PCV7) beginning in February 2000.

== Medical uses ==
In the United States, pneumococcal vaccine, polyvalent is indicated for active immunization for the prevention of pneumococcal disease caused by the 23 serotypes contained in the vaccine (1, 2, 3, 4, 5, 6B, 7F, 8, 9N, 9V, 10A, 11A, 12F, 14, 15B, 17F, 18C, 19F, 19A, 20, 22F, 23F, and 33F). It is approved for use in people 50 years of age or older and people aged two years of age or older who are at increased risk for pneumococcal disease. The World Health Organization (WHO) recommendations are similar. The WHO does not recommend use of pneumococcal polysaccharide vaccine in routine childhood immunization programs. The recommendations in the UK are similar, but include people with occupational hazards.

Pneumococcal vaccine may be beneficial to control exacerbations of chronic obstructive pulmonary disease (COPD).

The pneumococcal polysaccharide vaccine is important for those with HIV/AIDS. In Canadian patients infected with HIV, the vaccine has been reported to decrease the incidence of invasive pneumococcal disease from 768 per 100,000 person–years to 244 per 100,000 patient–years. Because of the low level of evidence for benefit, 2008 WHO guidelines do not recommend routine immunization with PPV-23 for HIV patients, and suggests preventing pneumococcal disease indirectly with trimethoprim–sulfamethoxazole chemoprophylaxis and antiretrovirals. While the U.S. Centers for Disease Control and Prevention (CDC) recommends immunization in all patients infected with HIV.

== Adverse events ==
The most common adverse reactions (reported in more than 10% of subjects vaccinated with pneumococcal polysaccharide vaccine in clinical trials) were: pain, soreness or tenderness at the site of injection (60.0%), injection-site swelling or temporary thickening or hardening of the skin (20.3%), headache (17.6%), injection-site redness (16.4%), weakness and fatigue (13.2%), and muscle pain (11.9%).

== Vaccination schedule ==
=== Adults and children over two years of age ===
The 23-valent vaccine (for example, Pneumovax 23) is effective against 23 different pneumococcal capsular types (serotypes 1, 2, 3, 4, 5, 6B, 7F, 8, 9N, 9V, 10A, 11A, 12F, 14, 15B, 17F, 18C, 19A, 19F, 20, 22F, 23F, and 33F), and so covers 90 percent of the types found in pneumococcal bloodstream infections.

=== Young children ===
Children under the age of two years fail to mount an adequate response to the 23-valent adult vaccine, and instead a multi-valent pneumococcal conjugate vaccine (for example, PCV13: Prevnar 13 or PCV21: Capvaxive) is used instead. The first of these was the PCV7 (Prevnar 7), and in 2010, the PCV13 replaced the PCV7, adding six new serotypes to the vaccine. While this covers only thirteen strains out of more than ninety strains, these thirteen strains caused 80–90 percent of cases of severe pneumococcal disease in the U.S. before introduction of the vaccine, and it is considered to be nearly 100 percent effective against these strains. As of 2025, a 15-valent, and later 20-valent (PCV20: Prevnar 20) successors to the Prevnar 13 have been introduced, in addition to the introduction of an 21-valent vaccine (PCV21: Capvaxive) not directly derived from the Prevnar series.. The PCV20 supersedes the PCV15, PCV13, and PCV7, but the PCV21 contains 11 serotypes not covered by the PCV20, and the distinct mechanism of the PPSV23 means it may be indicated in different circumstances than the conjugate vaccines. The PPSV23 additionally contains 2 serotypes not contained in the PCV20 but contained within the PCV21, and 2 serotypes contained within neither; the remaining 19 serotypes overlap the PCV20, notwithstanding the PCV21.

Special risk-groups
Children at special risk (e.g., sickle cell disease and those without a functioning spleen) require additional protection using the PCV13, with the more extensive PPSV-23 given after the second year of life or two months after the PCV13 dose:

Vaccination schedule for children at special risk in the UK
Age	2–6 months	7–11 months	12–23 months
PCV13	3 × monthly dose	2 × monthly dose	2 doses, 2 months apart
PCV13	Further dose in second year of life		2 doses, 2 months apart
PPSV-23	Single dose after second year of life, 2 months after PCV13		
