= Pneumococcal conjugate vaccine =

Vaccine against Strep pneumoniae

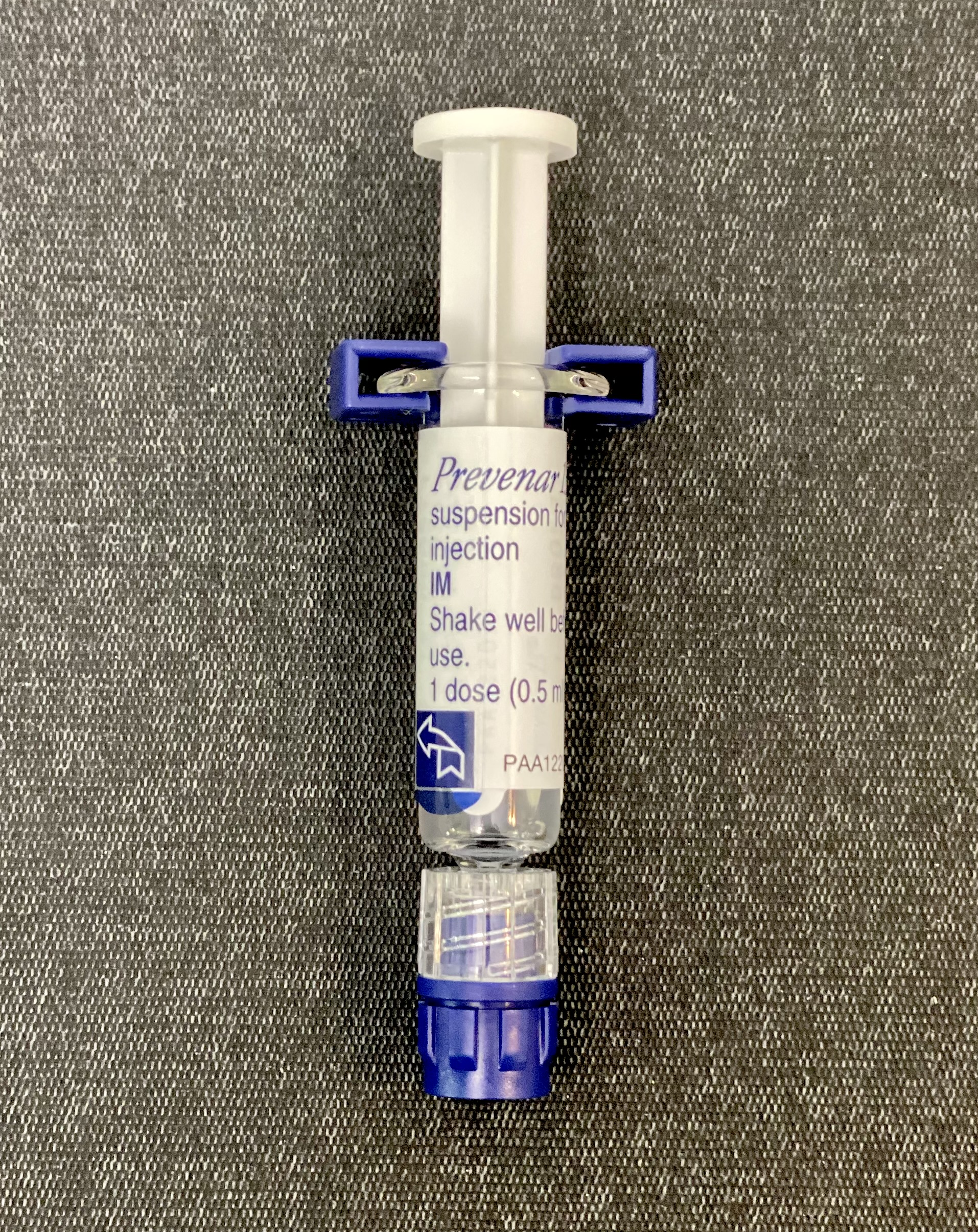
- Prevenar 13

Vaccine description
- Target: Streptococcus pneumoniae
- Vaccine type: Conjugate

Clinical data
- Trade names: Prevnar 20, Prevnar 13, Synflorix, others; discontinued Prevnar (PCV7)
- Other names: PCV, pneumococcal vaccine, capsular polysaccharides
- AHFS/Drugs.com: Monograph
- MedlinePlus: a607021
- License data: US DailyMed: Pneumococcal
- Pregnancy category: AU: B1
- Routes of administration: Intramuscular
- ATC code: J07AL02 (WHO)

Legal status
- Legal status: AU: S4 (Prescription only); CA: ℞-only / Schedule D; US: ℞-only; EU: Rx-only; In general: ℞ (Prescription only)

Identifiers
- ChemSpider: none
- KEGG: D10455; D12205

Pneumococcal conjugate vaccine is a pneumococcal vaccine made with the conjugate vaccine method and used to protect infants, young children, and geriatrics against disease caused by the bacterium Streptococcus pneumoniae (the so-called "pneumococcus"). It contains purified capsular polysaccharide of pneumococcal serotypes conjugated to a carrier protein (CRM197) so as to improve antibody response compared to the pneumococcal polysaccharide vaccine. The World Health Organization (WHO) recommends the use of the conjugate vaccine in routine immunizations given to children.

Vaccine-mediated immunity is "conferred mainly by opsonophagocytic killing of S. pneumoniae."

The most common side effects in children are decreased appetite, fever (only common in children aged six weeks to five years), irritability, reactions at the site of injection (reddening or hardening of the skin, swelling, pain or tenderness), somnolence (sleepiness) and poor quality sleep. In adults and the elderly, the most common side effects are decreased appetite, headaches, diarrhea, fever (only common in adults aged 18 to 29 years), vomiting (only very common in adults aged 18 to 49 years), rash, reactions at the site of injection, limitation of arm movement, arthralgia and myalgia (joint and muscle pain), chills and fatigue.

== Brands ==
=== Capvaxive ===
CAPVAXIVE™ is a pneumococcal 21-valent conjugate vaccine (PCV21, product code "PNEU-C-21") manufactured by Merck and was approved for medical use in the United States in June 2024. It is indicated for the active immunization for the prevention of invasive disease caused by Streptococcus pneumoniae serotypes 3, 6A, 7F, 8, 9N, 10A, 11A, 12F, 15A, 15B, 15C, 16F, 17F, 19A, 20A, 22F, 23A, 23B, 24F, 31, 33F, and 35B in individuals 18 years of age and older; and the active immunization for the prevention of pneumonia caused by S. pneumoniae serotypes 3, 6A, 7F, 8, 9N, 10A, 11A, 12F, 15A, 15C, 16F, 17F, 19A, 20A, 22F, 23A, 23B, 24F, 31, 33F, and 35B in individuals 18 years of age and older.

In January 2025, the Committee for Medicinal Products for Human Use of the European Medicines Agency adopted a positive opinion, recommending the granting of a marketing authorization for the medicinal product Capvaxive, a vaccine intended for the prevention of invasive disease and pneumonia caused by Streptococcus pneumoniae. Capvaxive was authorized for medical use in the European Union in March 2025.

=== Pneumosil ===
Pneumosil is a decavalent pneumococcal conjugate vaccine produced by the Serum Institute of India. It contains the serotypes 1, 5, 6A, 6B, 7F, 9V, 14, 19A, 19F, and 23F, and was prequalified by WHO in January 2020.

=== Prevnar ===
PREVNAR 20™ (PCV20, product code "PNEU-C-20") is the third version of a vaccine produced by the Wyeth subsidiary of Pfizer. In April 2023, the FDA approved Prevnar 20 for the prevention of invasive disease caused by the 20 different serotypes of S. pneumoniae contained in the vaccine (serotypes 1, 3, 4, 5, 6A, 6B, 7F, 8, 9V, 10A, 11A, 12F, 14, 15B, 18C, 19A, 19F, 22F, 23F, and 33F) for individuals 6 weeks through 17 years of age; and for the prevention of otitis media (ear infection) caused by 7 of the serotypes of Streptococcus pneumoniae contained in the vaccine for children 6 weeks through 5 years of age. In June 2023, the Advisory Committee on Immunization Practices (ACIP) approved PCV20 (Prevnar 20) for use in US children.

The second version, Prevnar 13 (PCV13), contained thirteen serotypes of pneumococcus (1, 3, 4, 5, 6A, 6B, 7F, 9V, 14, 18C, 19A, 19F, and 23F). It replaced Prevnar, the pneumococcal heptavalent conjugate vaccine (PCV7). Prevnar 13 was approved for use in the European Union in December 2009. In February 2010, Prevnar 13 was approved in the United States to replace Prevnar. After waiting for the outcome of a trial underway in the Netherlands, the Centers for Disease Control and Prevention (CDC) recommended the vaccine for adults over age 65 in August 2014.

The first version, the heptavalent Prevnar (PCV7), was produced from the seven most prevalent strains of Streptococcus pneumoniae bacteria in the U.S. (4, 6B, 9V, 14, 18C, 19F, and 23F). Prevnar was approved for use in the United States in February 2000, and vaccination with Prevnar was recommended for all children younger than 2 years and for unvaccinated children between 24 and 59 months old who were at high risk for pneumococcal infections. The formulation resulted in a 98% probability of protection against the constituent strains, which caused 80% of the pneumococcal disease in infants in the U.S. PCV7 is no longer produced.

In the Prevnar vaccines, the bacterial cell capsule sugars, a characteristic of these pathogens, are linked (conjugated) through reductive amination to CRM197, a nontoxic recombinant variant of diphtheria toxin. CRM197 is derived from the C7 strain of Corynebacterium diphtheriae grown in a medium of casamino acids and yeast extracts. Bacteria bearing the vaccine's polysaccharide sugars are grown separately in soy peptone broths. The resulting glycoconjugate produces a more robust immune response in most healthy persons. Aluminum is also added to the vaccine as an adjuvant, further enhancing the immune response.

=== Synflorix ===
Synflorix (PCV10) is produced by GlaxoSmithKline. It is a decavalent vaccine and thus contains ten serotypes of pneumococcus (1, 4, 5, 6B, 7F, 9V, 14, 18C, 19F, and 23F) which are conjugated to a carrier protein. Synflorix received a positive opinion from the European Medicines Agency (EMA) for use in the European Union in January 2009, and GSK received European Commission authorization to market Synflorix in March 2009.

=== Vaxneuvance ===
Vaxneuvance is a pneumococcal 15-valent conjugate vaccine created by Merck that was approved for medical use in the United States in July 2021. The vaccine was developed under the code name "V114". It is identical to PCV13, except that it adds serotypes 22F and 33F. These two serotypes are particularly important because, after "widespread use of the PCV13...[vaccine] in many countries," these two serotypes are "among leading serotypes causing IPD in children and adults."

Vaxneuvance is indicated for the active immunization for the prevention of invasive disease caused by Streptococcus pneumoniae serotypes 1, 3, 4, 5, 6A, 6B, 7F, 9V, 14, 18C, 19A, 19F, 22F, 23F and 33F in adults 18 years of age and older.

In October 2021, the Committee for Medicinal Products for Human Use (CHMP) of the European Medicines Agency (EMA) adopted a positive opinion, recommending the granting of a marketing authorization for the medicinal product Vaxneuvance, intended for prophylaxis against pneumococcal pneumonia and associated invasive disease. The applicant for this medicinal product is Merck Sharp & Dohme B.V. Vaxneuvance was approved for medical use in the European Union in December 2021.

== Schedule of vaccination ==
Pneumococcal conjugate vaccine immunization schedule

PCV third dose number unvaccinated

As with all immunizations, whether it is available or required, and under what circumstances, varies according to the decisions made by local public health agencies.

Children under the age of two years fail to mount an adequate response to the 23-valent adult vaccine, and so a pneumococcal conjugate vaccine is used. While this covers only seven strains out of more than ninety strains, these seven strains cause 80% to 90% of cases of severe pneumococcal disease, and it is considered to be nearly 100% effective against these strains.

=== United Kingdom ===
The UK childhood vaccination schedule for infants born after 31 December 2019, consists of a primary course of one dose at twelve weeks of age with a second dose at one year of age. For infants born before 1 January 2020 and those in Scotland, the childhood vaccination schedule consists of a primary course of two doses at eight and sixteen weeks of age with a final third dose at one year of age.

Children at special risk (e.g., sickle cell disease and asplenia) require as full protection as can be achieved using the conjugated vaccine, with the more extensive polysaccharide vaccine given after the second year of life:

Vaccination schedule for children at special risk
Age	2–6 months	7–11 months	12–23 months
Conjugated vaccine	3 × monthly dose	2 × monthly dose	2 doses, 2 months apart
Conjugated vaccine	Further dose in second year of life		2 doses, 2 months apart
23-valent vaccine	Then after 2nd birthday single dose of 23-valent		

=== United States ===
In 2001, the Centers for Disease Control and Prevention (CDC), upon advice from its Advisory Committee on Immunization Practices (ACIP), recommended the vaccine be administered to every infant and young child in the United States. The resulting demand outstripped production, creating shortages not resolved until 2004. All children, according to the U.S. vaccination schedule, should receive four doses, at two months, four months, six months, and again between one year and fifteen months of age.

The CDC updated the pneumococcal vaccine guidelines for adults 65 years of age or older in 2019.

In October 2021, the CDC recommended that adults 65 years of age or older who have not previously received a pneumococcal conjugate vaccine or whose previous vaccination history is unknown should receive a pneumococcal conjugate vaccine (either PCV20 or PCV15). If PCV15 is used, this should be followed by a dose of PPSV23. The CDC recommended that adults aged 19 to 64 years with certain underlying medical conditions or other risk factors who have not previously received a pneumococcal conjugate vaccine or whose previous vaccination history is unknown should receive a pneumococcal conjugate vaccine (either PCV20 or PCV15).

The CDC published revised and consolidated guidelines in September 2023, for children.

The CDC published revised and consolidated guidelines in September 2024, for adults aged 19 years of age and older.

== Efficacy ==
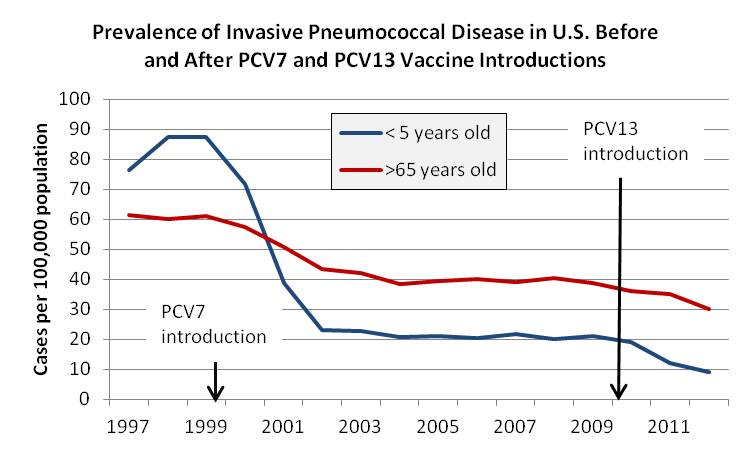
United States incidence of invasive pneumococcal disease before and after introduction of the 7-valent and 13-valent pneumococcal vaccines.

Prevnar-7 is designed to stop seven of about ninety pneumococcal serotypes which have the potential to cause invasive pneumococcal disease (IPD). In 2010, a 13-valent vaccine was introduced. Each year, IPD kills approximately one million children worldwide. Since approval, Prevnar's efficacy in preventing IPD has been documented by a number of epidemiologic studies. There is evidence that other people in the same household as a vaccinee also become relatively protected. There is evidence that routine childhood vaccination reduces the burden of pneumococcal disease in adults and especially high-risk adults, such as those living with HIV/AIDS.

The vaccine is, however, primarily developed for the U.S. and European epidemiological situation, and therefore it has a limited coverage of serotypes causing serious pneumococcal infections in most developing countries.

== Adverse reactions ==
Local reactions such as pain, swelling, or redness occur in up to 50% of those vaccinated with PCV13; of these, 8% are considered severe. Local reactions are more likely after the 4th dose than the earlier doses. In clinical trials, fever greater than 100.4 F (38 C) was reported at a rate of 24–35% following any dose in the primary series and nonspecific symptoms such as decreased appetite or irritability occur in up to 80% of recipients. In a vaccine safety datalink study, febrile seizures occurred in roughly 1 in 83,000 to 1 in 6,000 children given PCV 13, and 1 in 21,000 to 1 in 2,000 of those who were given PCV13 and trivalent influenza vaccine at the same time.

== Evidence supporting addition to routine vaccination schedules ==
After introduction of the pneumococcal conjugate vaccine in 2000, several studies described a decrease in invasive pneumococcal disease in the United States. One year after its introduction, a group of investigators found a 69% drop in the rate of invasive disease in those of less than two years of age. By 2004, all-cause pneumonia admission rates had declined by 39% (95% CI 22–52) and rates of hospitalizations for pneumococcal meningitis decreased by 66% (95% CI 56.3–73.5) in children younger than 2.

Rates of invasive pneumococcal disease among adults have also declined since the introduction of the vaccine.

== Vaccination in low-income countries ==
Evolution of pneumococcal and rotavirus vaccine coverage from 2006 to 2022 in Gavi and non-Gavi countries. Gavi countries are the 54 Gavi 5.0 eligible countries. Coverage data are WHO/UNICEF estimates of the percentage of infants who have received three doses of Pneumococcal conjugate vaccine.

Pneumococcal disease is the leading vaccine-preventable killer of young children worldwide, according to the World Health Organization (WHO). It killed more than 500,000 children younger than five years of age in 2008 alone. Approximately ninety percent of these deaths occur in the developing world. Historically 15–20 years pass before a new vaccine reaches one quarter of the population of the developing world.

Pneumococcal vaccines Accelerated Development and Introduction Plan (PneumoADIP) was a GAVI Alliance (GAVI) funded project to accelerate the introduction of pneumococcal vaccinations into low-income countries through partnerships between countries, donors, academia, international organizations and industry. GAVI continues this work and as of March 2013, 25 GAVI-eligible and supported countries have introduced the pneumococcal conjugate vaccine. Further, 15 additional GAVI countries have plans to introduce the vaccine into their national immunization program and 23 additional countries have approved GAVI support to introduce the vaccine.

== Society and culture ==
=== Legal status ===
In December 2021, the Committee for Medicinal Products for Human Use (CHMP) of the European Medicines Agency (EMA) adopted a positive opinion, recommending the granting of a marketing authorization for the medicinal product Apexxnar, intended for prophylaxis against pneumococcal pneumonia and associated invasive disease. The applicant for this medicinal product is Pfizer Europe MA EEIG. Apexxnar was authorized for medical use in the European Union in February 2022.

In January 2025, the CHMP adopted a positive opinion, recommending the granting of a marketing authorization for the medicinal product Capvaxive, a vaccine intended for the prevention of invasive disease and pneumonia caused by Streptococcus pneumoniae. The applicant for this medicinal product is Merck Sharp & Dohme B.V. Capvaxive was authorized for medical use in the European Union in March 2025.

=== Economics ===
Pfizer reported revenue of US$6.44 billion for the Prevnar family of vaccines (Prevnar 20/Apexxnar (pediatric and adult) and Prevnar 13/Prevnar 13 (pediatric and adult)) in 2023.

== Research ==
In 2022, Merck researchers investigated a 21-valent vaccine (code named V116) against pneumococcus serotypes. The vaccine is geared towards persons living with HIV.
