= Tick-borne encephalitis vaccine =

Vaccine against tick-borne encephalitis

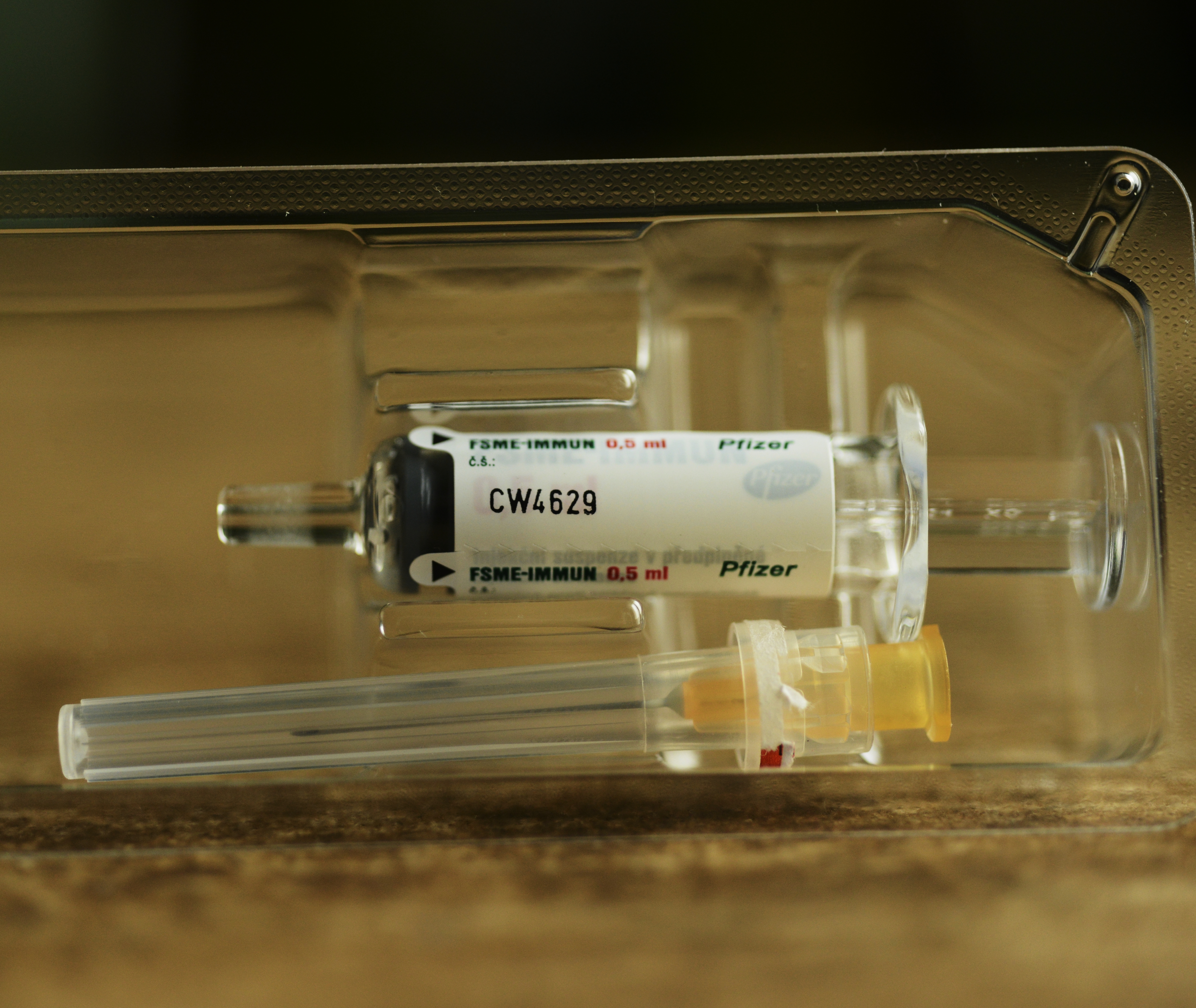
- FSME-Immun (European TBE vaccine)

Vaccine description
- Target: Tick-borne encephalitis virus
- Vaccine type: Inactivated

Clinical data
- Trade names: Encepur N, FSME-Immun CC, Ticovac, others
- Routes of administration: Intramuscular
- ATC code: J07BA01 (WHO)

Legal status
- Legal status: UK: POM (Prescription only); US: ℞-only

Identifiers
- CAS Number: 1704520-39-7
- DrugBank: DB16611
- ChemSpider: none
- KEGG: D12206

Tick-borne encephalitis vaccine is a vaccine used to prevent tick-borne encephalitis (TBE). The disease is most common in Central and Eastern Europe, and Northern Asia. More than 87% of people who receive the vaccine develop immunity. It is not useful following the bite of an infected tick. It is given by injection into a muscle.

The World Health Organization (WHO) recommends immunizing all people in areas where the disease is common. Otherwise the vaccine is just recommended for those who are at high risk. Three doses are recommended followed by additional doses every three to five years. The vaccines can be used in people more than one or three years of age depending on the formulation. The vaccine appears to be safe during pregnancy.

Serious side effects are very uncommon. Minor side effects may include fever, and redness and pain at the site of injection. Older formulations were more commonly associated with side effects.

The first vaccine against TBE was developed in 1937. It is on the World Health Organization's List of Essential Medicines. The vaccine was approved for medical use in the United States in August 2021.

== Medical uses ==
In the United States, the tick-borne encephalitis vaccine is indicated for active immunization to prevent tick-borne encephalitis (TBE) in individuals one year and older.

The efficacy of these vaccines has been well documented. They have also been shown to protect mice from a lethal challenge with several TBE-virus isolates obtained over more than 30 years from all over Europe and the Asian part of the former Soviet Union. In addition, it has been demonstrated that antibodies induced by vaccination of human volunteers neutralized all tested isolates.

=== Pregnancy and breastfeeding ===
The vaccine appears to be safe during pregnancy, but because of insufficient data the vaccine is only recommended during pregnancy and breastfeeding when it is considered urgent to achieve protection against TBE infection and after careful consideration of risks versus benefits.

=== Schedule ===
Two to three doses are recommended depending on the formulation. Typically one to three months should occur between the first doses followed by five to twelve months before the final dose. Additional doses are then recommended every three to five years. A study from 2006 suggests that the FSME-Immun/Ticovac and Encepur are interchangeable for booster vaccination, but cautions against change during the primary immunization course.

== History ==
The first vaccine against TBE was developed in the late 1930s in the Soviet Union, based on the Sofyin strain of the TBE virus. The vaccine was prepared from an infected mouse brain suspension, inactivated with formalin. Initial trials were conducted on forced Gulag laborers before research was replicated in other countries.

As there were frequent reports of negative side effects towards the mouse brain components of the vaccine, scientists across countries worked on developing new vaccines. The Institute of Poliomyelitis and Viral Encephalitis developed new TBE vaccines in the late 1950s based on cell cultures from chicken embryos.

Later, in 1972, the veterinary microbiologist James Keppie at Porton Down in the United Kingdom led the development of a new TBE vaccine. It was based on the Neudörfl strain of the TBE virus provided by Christian Kunz, an Austrian virologist. Kunz then led human trials in Austria; after these trials were successful, public vaccination campaigns soon began. This vaccine was patented in 1980 in Austria by Immuno AG, which was later purchased by Baxter International.

== Society and culture ==
=== Economics ===
Per dose it costs between £50 and £70 in the United Kingdom.

=== Brand names ===
Brand names of the vaccines include Encepur N, FSME-Immun CC and Ticovac, Encevir-Neo, Klesh-E-Vak.
