= Blueberry muffin baby =

Purplish skin bumps on a newborn

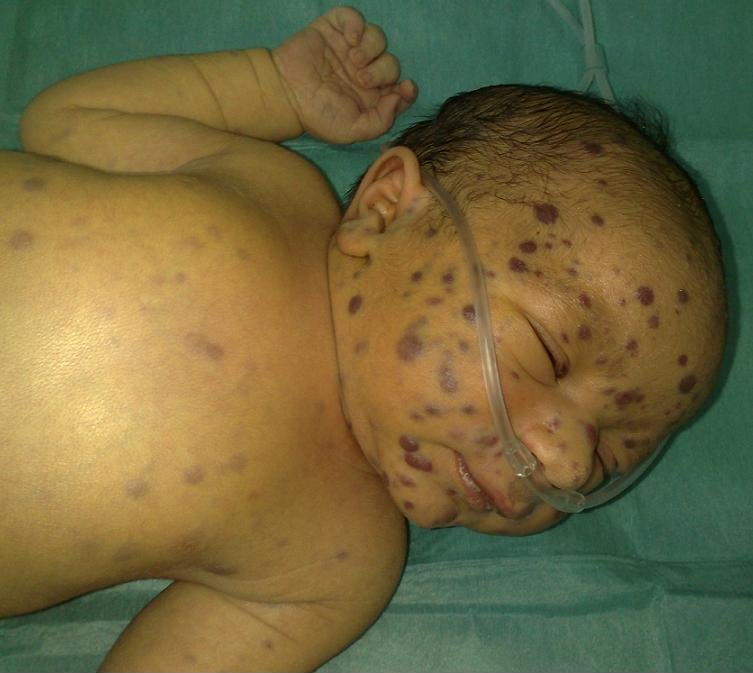
- A newborn baby with typical lesions of a blueberry muffin baby.
- Specialty: Pediatrics, dermatology
- Symptoms: Reddish-blue purpura localized mainly to the face, neck, and trunk
- Causes: Intrauterine infection e.g. with rubella, Cytomegalovirus; blood disorders; malignancies
- Diagnostic method: Blood tests, viral cultures, Coombs test, skin biopsy
- Differential diagnosis: Hemangiopericytoma, blue rubber bleb nevus, hemangioma, glomangioma
- Prevention: MMR vaccine prevents rubella infection
- Frequency: Uncommon

Blueberry muffin baby, also known as dermal extramedullary hematopoiesis, describes a newborn baby with multiple purpura, associated with several non-cancerous and cancerous conditions in which extra blood is produced in the skin. The bumps range from 1-7 mm, do not blanch and have a tendency to occur on the head, neck and trunk. They often fade by three to six weeks after birth, leaving brownish marks. When due to a cancer, the bumps tend to be fewer, firmer and larger.

The condition can occur following infection of an unborn baby with rubella (causing congenital rubella syndrome), cytomegalovirus, toxoplasmosis, or coxsackie virus. Other viral causes include parvovirus B19 and herpes simplex. Non-infectious causes include haemolytic disease of the newborn, hereditary spherocytosis, twin-to-twin transfusion syndrome and recombinant erythropoietin administration. Some types of cancers can cause it such as rhabdomyosarcoma, extrosseal Ewing sarcoma, Langerhans cell histiocytosis, congenital leukaemia and neuroblastoma. During normal development of an unborn baby, blood production can occur in the skin until the fifth month of pregnancy. Blueberry muffin lesions in the newborn indicate the prolongation of skin blood production after birth.

Diagnosis involves a combination of appearance and laboratory studies, including blood tests for complete blood count, haemoglobin, viral cultures and Coombs test. A skin biopsy may be useful. Conditions that may appear similar include hemangiopericytoma, blue rubber bleb nevus, hemangioma and glomangioma.

Prognosis is variable based upon the cause of the characteristic rash. Treatment may include supportive care, anti-viral medication, transfusion, or chemotherapy depending on the underlying cause.

It is not common. The term was coined in the 1960s to describe the skin changes in babies with congenital rubella syndrome. Since then, it has been realised that blueberry muffin marks occur in several conditions.

== Signs and symptoms ==
These lesions are typically non-blanching macules or papules that present as a generalized rash in the newborn.

== Causes ==
During normal embryologic development, hematopoiesis can occur in the dermis until the fifth month of gestation. Blueberry muffin lesions in the neonate indicate the prolongation of dermal extramedullary hematopoiesis outside of the gestational period.

The blueberry muffin rash was originally considered unique to congenital rubella syndrome, but it is now considered to be potentially associated with many other intrauterine infections, hematologic diseases, and malignancies. Other infections that can cause this rash include cytomegalovirus, herpes virus, and toxoplasma. Blood disorders, such as hereditary spherocytosis and hemolytic disease of the newborn, that increase extramedullary hemotopoeisis can also cause a blueberry muffin baby. It is also possible that a neonate with the blueberry muffin rash can have an underlying malignancy such as metastatic neuroblastoma and congenital leukemia. Listed below are a few known conditions that can cause a blueberry muffin baby.

=== Infectious ===
- Toxoplasmosis: infection due to Toxoplasma gondii parasite. Condition is commonly associated with undercooked meat or contact with cat feces. Symptoms of this disease include seizures, hydrocephalus, and chorioretinitis.
- Cytomegalovirus: infection associated with sensorineural hearing loss, hepatomegaly, and jaundice.
- Rubella: viral infection associated with post-auricular and occipital lymphadenopathy in addition to a maculopapular rash that starts on the face and spreads to the trunk.
- Herpes virus: viral infection associated with painful vesicular lesions and meningitis.
- Syphilis: bacterial infection due to Treponema pallidum. Congenital syphilis can present with saber shins, saddle-shaped nose, Hutchinson's teeth, and deafness.
- Epstein Barr virus: viral infection that causes infectious mononucleosis. Condition is associated with lymphadenopathy, splenomegaly, and various lymphomas

=== Hematologic ===
- Hereditary spherocytosis: autosomal dominant disease that results in formation of aberrant erythrocyte membrane protein. This condition results in structural change of red blood cells (RBCs), shearing of RBCs, and anemia.
- Hemolytic disease of the newborn (ABO or Rh incompatibility): Condition is due to maternal and fetal red blood cell mismatch. Maternal antibodies destroy fetal RBCs which results in anemia.

=== Neoplastic ===
- Neuroblastoma: pediatric cancer due to malignancy in neuroblast cells. Tumor is usually localized to the adrenal glands.
- Congenital leukemia: pediatric cancer due to malignancy of white blood cells.
- Congenital rhabdomyosarcoma: pediatric cancer due to malignancy of mesenchymal cells that have failed to fully differentiate into muscle cells

=== Systemic ===
- Langerhans cell histiocytosis (LCH): Condition due to excess build-up of Langerhans cells.
- Lupus: autoimmune disease

== Diagnosis ==
Diagnosis of the medical condition is based on a combination of clinical presentation, physical exam, and laboratory studies. When this characteristic rash is found in a neonate, laboratory workup is prompted.

Initial workup usually includes a complete blood count (CBC) with differential to evaluate for underlying blood disorders. Laboratory confirmation of the cause of the blueberry muffin rash depends on the underlying illness.

For example, serology positive for rubella specific antibodies, viral culture with isolated rubella, or isolation of rubella virus RNA through polymerase chain reaction can all confirm that intrauterine rubella infection is the underlying cause of the blueberry muffin rash. Other manifestations of congenital rubella syndrome can also appear in conjunction with the characteristic rash. These include congenital glaucoma, jaundice, hepatosplenomegaly, microcephaly, cataracts, or sensorineural hearing loss. The presence of these features can further bolster the diagnosis of intrauterine rubella infection as the cause of the blueberry muffin baby. Laboratory studies for congenital rubella syndrome should be done prior to 1 year of age as diagnosis becomes more challenging afterwards.

In the case of infection with cytomegalovirus (CMV), patients can present with associated symptoms such as deafness and chorioretinitis. On lab studies, there may be a high anti-cytomegalovirus antibody titer, positive CMV urine culture, and thrombocytopenia.

If the cause is due to hemolytic disease of the newborn or hereditary spherocytosis, the neonate will have a positive Coomb's test and unconjugated hyperbilirubinemia.

Malignancies such as neuroblastoma and acute myeloid leukemia are all rare but possible causes of a blueberry muffin baby. Most of the time, these conditions are diagnosed using immunohistochemistry and biopsy.

== Prognosis ==
Prognosis is variable based on underlying cause. Usually the lesions should resolve within three to six weeks post-delivery. There has been a documented case of the rash completely resolving following a blood transfusion to treat severe anemia in a neonate. The rash is usually transient and will resolve once the underlying cause is treated.

== Treatment ==
Treatment is variable based on underlying cause. If significant anemia is present, blood transfusion may be indicated. In the case of congenital rubella syndrome, there is no cure. Therefore, the focus of treatment is disease prevention. The MMR vaccine is highly efficacious in preventing congenital rubella and is given routinely as a part of the pediatric vaccine schedule. For neonates with congenital CMV infection, antiviral medication is given. Most commonly, valganciclovir or ganciclovir are used as first-line antiviral therapy for congenital CMV. If the cause is a malignancy, the patient should receive cancer treatment such as chemotherapy. Overall, treatment of the blueberry muffin baby is centered around the underlying cause.

== See also ==
- List of cutaneous conditions
