= Paul Parkman =

American physician (1932–2024)

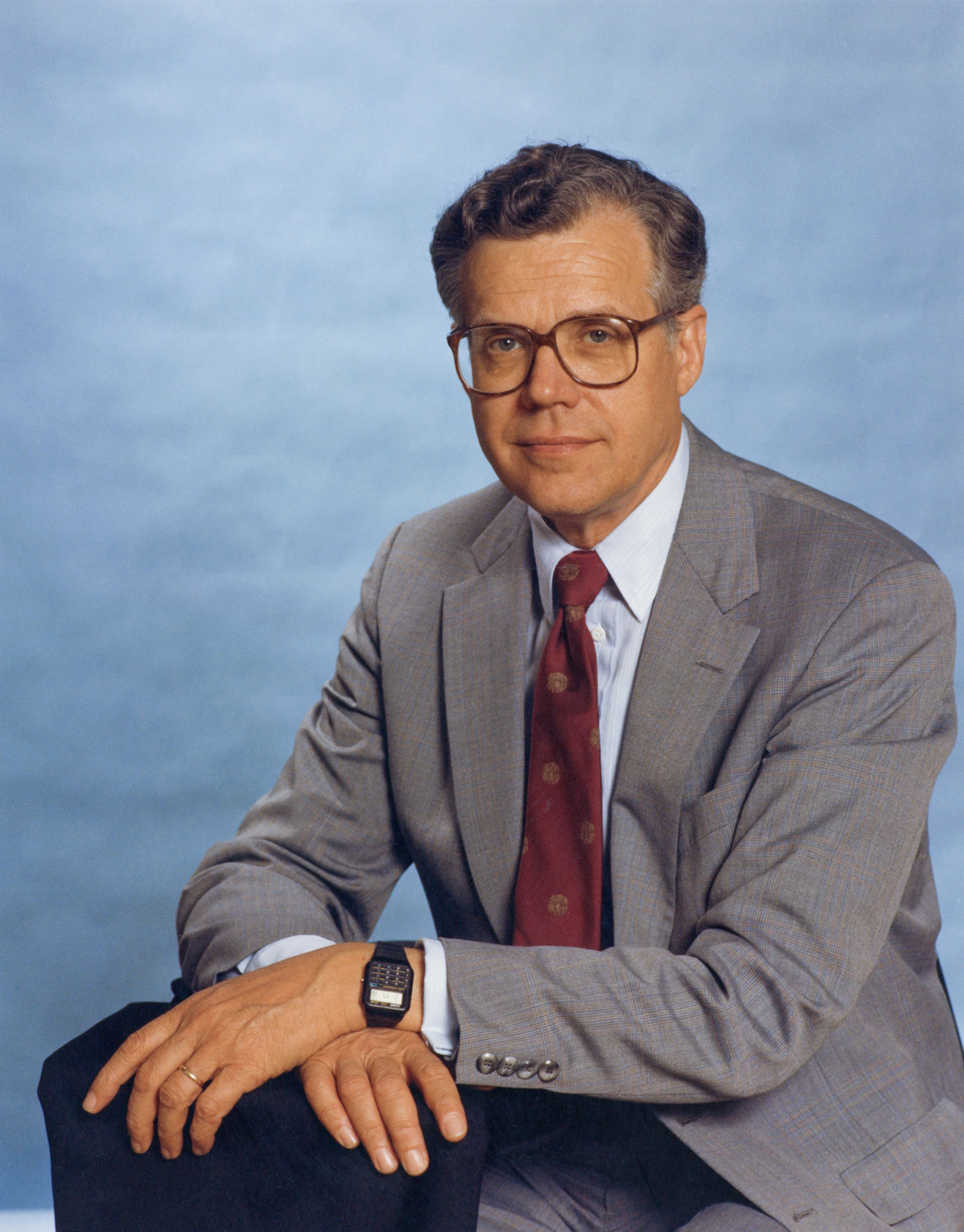
- Born: Paul Douglas Parkman; May 29, 1932; Auburn, New York, U.S.
- Died: May 7, 2024 (aged 91); Auburn, New York, U.S.
- Education: St. Lawrence University; State University Health Science Center
- Known for: Co-developer of rubella vaccine
- Spouse: Elmerina Leonardi (m. 1955)
- Scientific career
- Fields: Virology
- Workplaces: Walter Reed Army Institute of Research; National Institutes of Health; Center for Biologics Evaluation and Research

Paul Douglas Parkman (May 29, 1932 – May 7, 2024) was an American physician-scientist and virologist. He was one of the developers of the rubella vaccine.

== Early life and education ==
Paul Douglas Parkman was born in Auburn, New York, to Mary (Klumpp) Parkman, a homemaker, and Stuart Parkman, a postal clerk. He and his brother and sister were raised in Weedsport, New York. Parkman suffered from allergies and asthma as a child. In 1950, he graduated from Weedsport Central School.

In 1955, Parkman married Elmerina Leonardi, whom he had met in kindergarten. In 1957, he received both a bachelor's degree in pre-medicine from St. Lawrence University and a medical degree from the State University Health Science Center. He interned at Mary Imogene Bassett Hospital in Cooperstown, New York, before returning to the State University as a pediatric medical resident.

== Career ==
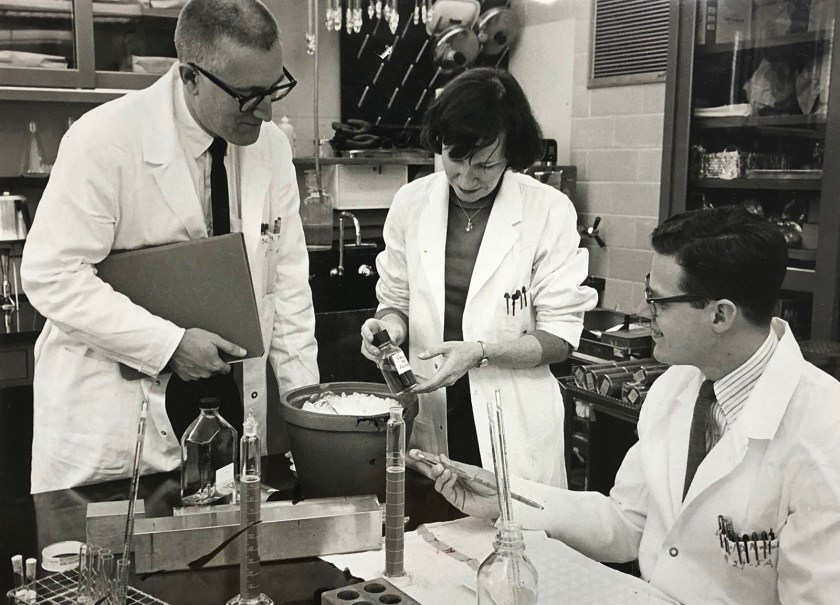
Harry M. Meyer, Jr. (light hair), Parkman (dark hair), and Hope E. Hopps of the Laboratory of Viral Immunology, Division of Biologics Standard working with rubella antigen in laboratory setting c. 1965.

In 1960, Parkman joined the Army Medical Corps as a captain. As part of the Corps, Parkman worked at Walter Reed Army Institute of Research in Silver Spring, Maryland, where he became interested in virology. He was on the team at Walter Reed which identified and isolated the rubella virus. The army was largely uninterested in the research, as rubella was not a threat to those serving in the military. However, when Parkman joined the National Institutes of Health (NIH) in 1963, they showed interest in his research.

In 1965, Parkman and his team began clinical trials of a rubella vaccine in Arkansas. In 1966, he and his colleagues announced the creation of a rubella vaccine, and in 1967, they announced the creation of a rubella antibody test. In 1969, a vaccine using their isolated virus was licensed commercially. He and his team did not monetize their patents, wanting the vaccine to be freely available.

Parkman became the NIH's chief of general virology. He maintained the role until 1972, when the department was "absorbed by the Food and Drug Administration" (FDA). He then worked at the FDA's Center for Biologics Evaluation and Research, where he served as director from 1987 to 1990. As director, he dealt with policies for the testing of HIV/AIDS, approved a bacterial meningitis vaccine, and increased the scrutiny paid to blood banks. Parkman retired in 1990.

After his retirement from the FDA, Parkman worked with pharmaceutical companies and the World Health Organization as a consultant, retiring again in the mid-2010s.

== Later life and death ==
In 2021, Parkman advocated for people to receive COVID-19 vaccines.

Parkman died of lymphoblastic leukemia at his home in Auburn, New York, on May 7, 2024, at the age of 91.

== Legacy ==
In 1988, glass artist Dan Dailey created the Parkman Coupe, a glass and bronze art piece celebrating Parkman's work with rubella. In 1999, Parkman and his wife donated the piece to the Smithsonian American Art Museum.

Parkman was the first recipient of Weedsport Central School's Graduate of Distinction award.
