= 1962–1965 rubella epidemic =

US outbreak of rubella

- Disease: rubella
- Pathogen: rubella virus
- Location: United States, Europe
- Date: 1962–1965

The 1962–1965 rubella epidemic was an outbreak of rubella across Europe and the United States. The rubella virus, also known as the German measles, is a single-stranded RNA virus from the family Togaviridae and genus Rubivirus. Typically, the virus is transmitted via droplets, such as coughing or sneezing, however, congenital rubella can be passed on from a pregnant woman to her fetus. The disease itself is fairly mild, usually presenting with a rash on the face and general sickness symptoms, such as coughing, fever, and fatigue, however, the real danger lies in rubella infections in women who are pregnant. Pregnant women with rubella are at risk of having a miscarriage or having a baby born with multiple birth defects due to congenital rubella syndrome.

It affected around 12.5 million people in the US. An estimated 11,000 pregnancies ended in miscarriage or stillbirth, just over 2,000 newborn babies died, and of those that survived around 20,000 babies had congenital rubella syndrome (CRS). The amount of pregnant women affected by the disease had great repercussions on outlook of abortion. Roe v. Wade was decided in 1973, eight years after the rubella epidemic that gave many Americans a different view on the termination of a pregnancy.

The epidemic led the drive to develop a vaccine which has helped the United States to see as little as 10 new rubella cases a year.

== History ==
Due to the mild symptoms of rubella, the disease was able to exist in many countries without much notice or attention. However, in 1942 an Australian ophthalmologist, Norman Gregg, discovered that the virus caused birth defects. This led to scientists and doctors putting more effort into understanding the disease and finding ways to prevent it. Twenty years later, an outbreak of rubella took place in Europe and eventually made its way to the United States.

== Abortion as treatment ==
With new information out about the effects of the rubella virus on a fetus, some expectant women and physicians wanted the termination of the pregnancy to be an option. Abortion was illegal in the United States at the height of this epidemic, however, physicians were allowed to perform therapeutic abortions if they believed the mother would be in danger or the fetus would be non-viable or suffer severe damage.

== See also ==
- Stanley Plotkin
- List of notable disease outbreaks in the United States
