= Rubella vaccine =

Vaccine used to prevent rubella

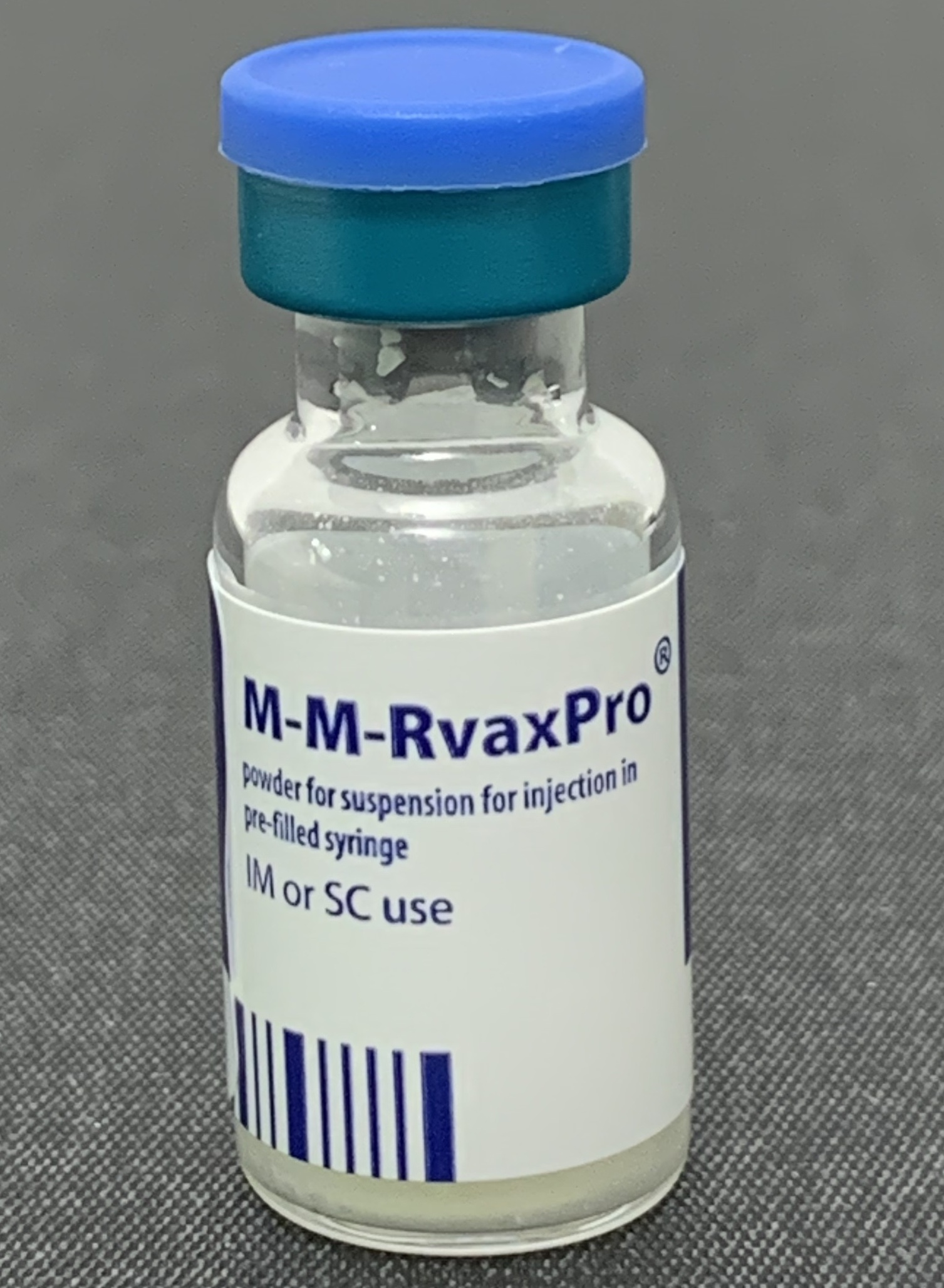
- MMR vaccine contains rubella vaccine.

Vaccine description
- Target: Rubella
- Vaccine type: Attenuated

Clinical data
- Trade names: Meruvax, other
- MedlinePlus: a601176
- ATC code: J07BJ01 (WHO)

Identifiers
- CAS Number: 1704526-12-4
- ChemSpider: none

Rubella vaccine is a vaccine used to prevent rubella. Effectiveness begins about two weeks after a single dose and around 95% of people become immune. Countries with high rates of immunization no longer see cases of rubella or congenital rubella syndrome. When there is a low level of childhood immunization in a population it is possible for rates of congenital rubella to increase as more women make it to child-bearing age without either vaccination or exposure to the disease. Therefore, it is important for more than 80% of people to be vaccinated. By introducing rubella containing vaccines, rubella has been eradicated in 81 nations, as of mid-2020.

The World Health Organization (WHO) recommends that the rubella vaccine be included in routine vaccinations. If not all people are immunized then at least women of childbearing age should be immunized. It should not be given to those who are pregnant or those with very poor immune function. While one dose is often all that is required for lifelong protection, often two doses are given.

Side effects are generally mild. They may include fever, rash, and pain and redness at the site of injection. Joint pain may be reported at between one and three weeks following vaccination in women. Severe allergies are rare. The rubella vaccine is a live attenuated vaccine. It is available either by itself or in combination with other vaccines. Combinations include with measles (MR vaccine), measles and mumps vaccine (MMR vaccine) and measles, mumps and varicella vaccine (MMRV vaccine).

A rubella vaccine was first licensed in 1969. It is on the World Health Organization's List of Essential Medicines. As of 2019, more than 173 countries included it in their routine vaccinations.

== Medical uses ==
Rubella vaccine is used to provide protection against infection by the rubella virus.

Rubella vaccine is on the World Health Organization's List of Essential Medicines.

=== Schedule ===
There are two main ways to deliver the rubella vaccine. The first is initially efforts to immunize all people less than forty years old followed by providing a first dose of vaccine between 9 and 12 months of age. Otherwise simply women of childbearing age can be vaccinated.

While only one dose is necessary two doses are often given as it usually comes mixed with the measles vaccine.

=== Pregnancy ===
Women who are planning to become pregnant are recommended to have rubella immunity beforehand, as the virus has a potential to cause miscarriage or serious birth defects. Immunity may be verified by pre-pregnancy blood test, and it is recommended that those with negative results should refrain from getting pregnant for at least a month after receiving the vaccine.

The vaccine theoretically should not be given during pregnancy. However, more than a thousand women have been given the vaccine when they did not realize that they were pregnant and no negative outcomes occurred. Testing for pregnancy before giving the vaccine is not needed.

If a low titre is found during pregnancy, the vaccine should be given after delivery. It is also advisable to avoid becoming pregnant for the four weeks following the administration of the vaccine.

== History ==
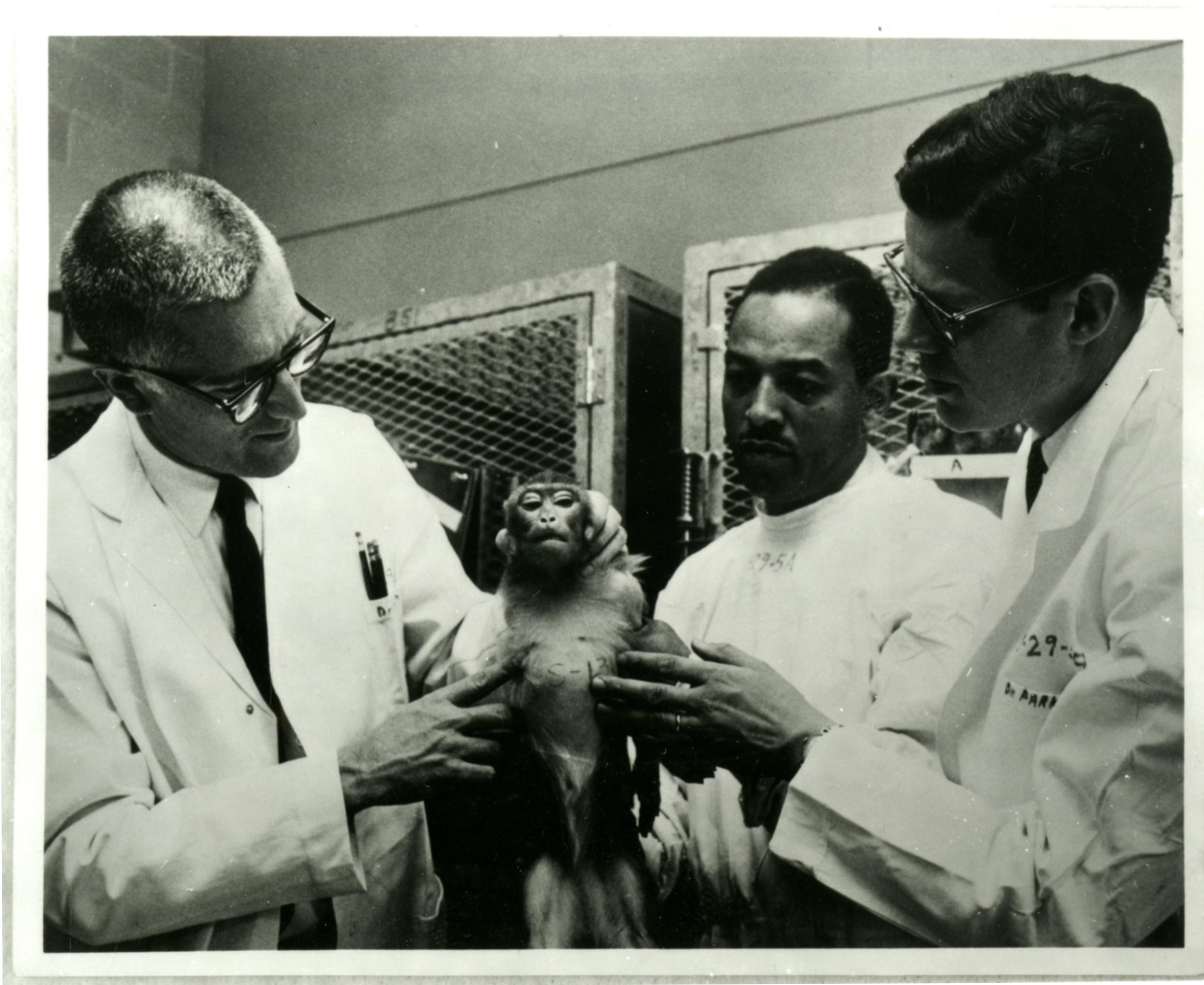
Laboratory monkey inspected by Drs. Harry M. Meyer Jr. (left) and Paul D. Parkman (right), assisted by Rudyard Wallace, technician (center)

Since the 1962–1965 rubella epidemic that swept Europe in 1962-1963 and the US in 1964–1965, several efforts were made to develop effective vaccines using attenuated viral strains, both in US and abroad.

=== HPV-77 ===
The first successful strain to be used was the HPV-77, prepared by passing the virus through the cells of an African green monkey kidney 77 times. The efforts to develop the vaccine were conducted by a team of researchers at the National Institutes of Health's Division of Biologics Standards. Led by Harry M. Meyer and Paul D. Parkman, the team included Hope E. Hopps, Ruth L. Kirschstein, and Rudyard Wallace among others, the team began serious work on the vaccine with the arrival of a major rubella epidemic in the United States in 1964. Prior to arriving at the National Institutes of Health (NIH), Parkman had been working on isolating the rubella virus for the Army. He joined the laboratory of Harry Meyer.

Parkman, Meyer, and the team from the NIH tested the vaccine at the Children's Colony in Conway, Arkansas in 1965 while a rubella epidemic still raged across the United States. This residential home provided care for children with cognitive disabilities and children who were ill. The ability to isolate children in their cabins and control access to the children made it an ideal location for testing a vaccine without starting an epidemic of rubella. Each of the children's parents provided consent for the participation in the trial.

In June 1969, the NIH issued the first license for commercial production of the rubella vaccine to the pharmaceutical company Merck Sharp & Dohme. This vaccine made use of the HPV77 rubella strain and was produced in duck embryo cells. This version of the rubella vaccine was in use for only a few years before the introduction of the combined measles, mumps, and rubella (MMR) vaccine in 1971.

=== RA 27/3 ===
Most of the modern Rubella vaccines (including the combination vaccine MMR) contain the RA 27/3 strain, which was developed by Stanley Plotkin and Leonard Hayflick at the Wistar Institute in Philadelphia. The vaccine was attenuated and prepared in the WI-38 normal human diploid cell strain which was developed by Hayflick and provided to Plotkin by him.

In order to isolate the virus, instead of taking swab samples from the throats of infected patients, which could have been contaminated with other resident viruses, Plotkin decided to utilize aborted fetuses provided by the department of Obstetrics and Gynecology of the Hospital of the University of Pennsylvania. At the time, abortion was illegal in most of the United States (including Pennsylvania), but doctors were allowed to perform "therapeutic abortions" when the life of the woman was in danger. Some started to perform them also on women infected with rubella. Several dozens of aborted fetuses were collected and studied by Plotkin. The kidney tissue from fetus 27 produced the strain that was used to develop the attenuated rubella vaccine. The name RA 27/3 refers to "Rubella Abortus", 27th fetus, 3rd organ to be harvested (the kidney).

The vaccine was first approved by the UK in 1970. The strain became the preferred vaccine used by pharmaceutical companies over the HPV-77, due to several considerations, including its higher immunogenicity; Merck made it its mainstay rubella vaccine in 1979.

Parkman and his team did not monetize their patents, wanting the vaccine to be freely available.

== Types ==
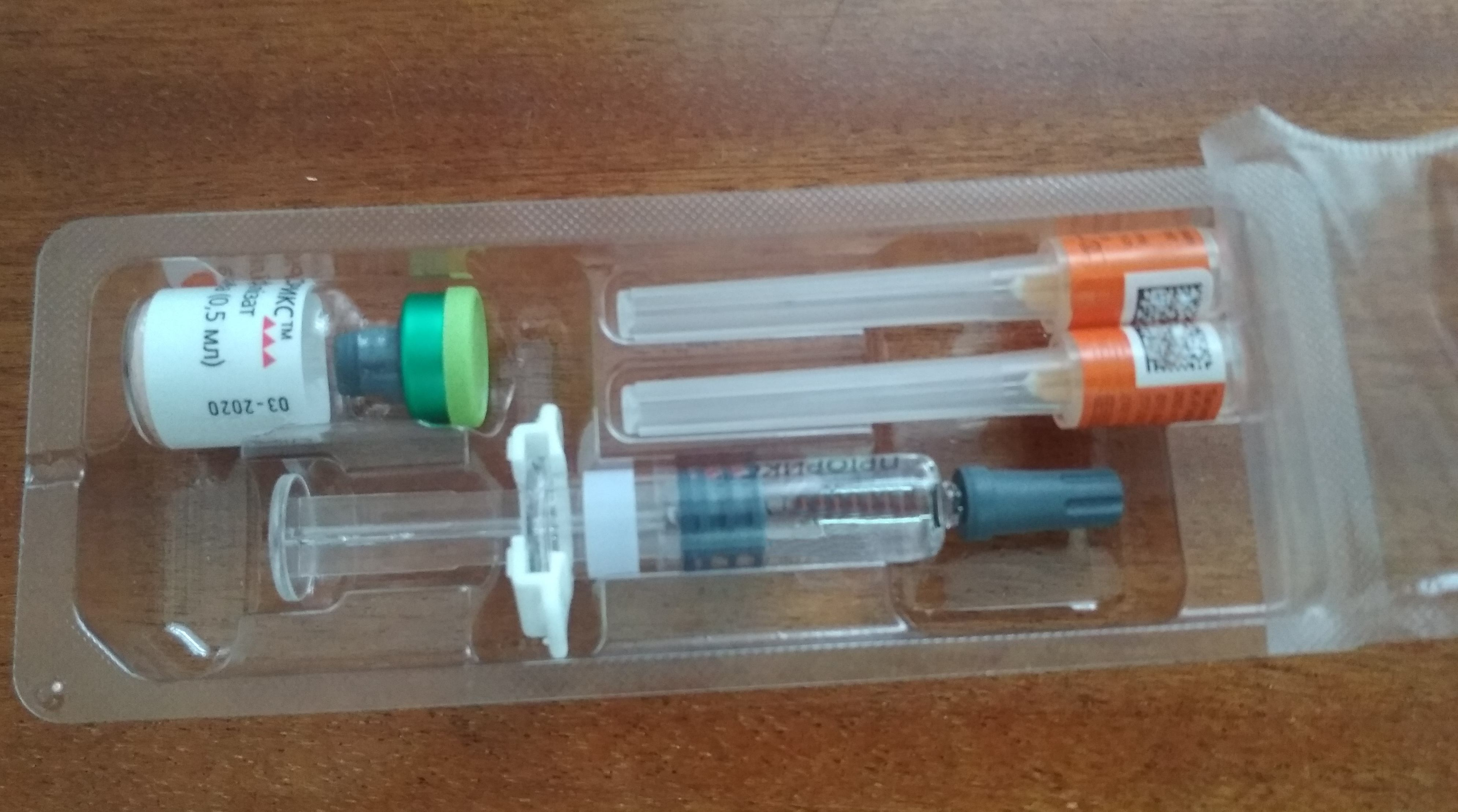
Measles, mumps and rubella combined vaccine (MMR vaccine)

Rubella is seldom given as an individual vaccine and is often given in combination with measles, mumps, or varicella (chickenpox) vaccines. Below is the list of measles-containing vaccines:

- Rubella vaccine (standalone vaccine)
- Measles and rubella combined vaccine (MR vaccine)
- Measles, mumps and rubella combined vaccine (MMR vaccine)
- Measles, mumps, rubella and varicella combined vaccine (MMRV vaccine). The measles vaccine is equally effective for preventing measles in all formulations, but side effects vary depending with the combination.
