= Congenital cytomegalovirus infection =

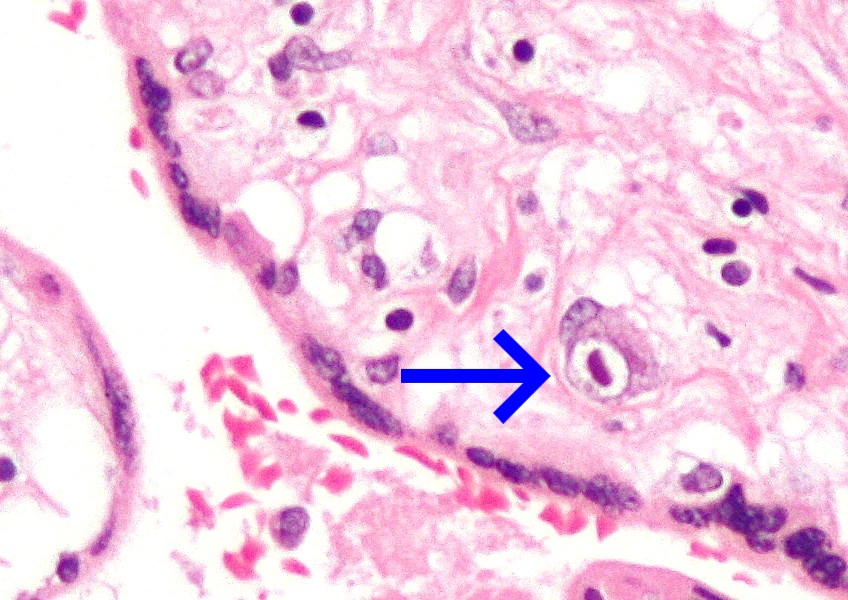
- Micrograph of a cytomegalovirus (CMV) infection of the placenta (CMV placentitis). The characteristic large nucleus of a CMV infected cell is seen off-centre at the bottom-right of the image. H&E stain
- Specialty: Pediatrics
- Frequency: 0.03%

Congenital cytomegalovirus (cCMV) is cytomegalovirus (CMV) infection during pregnancy which leads the a baby being born with the infection. Most have no symptoms. Some affected babies are small. Other signs and symptoms include a rash, jaundice, hepatomegaly, retinitis, and seizures. It may lead to loss of hearing or vision, developmental disability, or a small head.

CMV is a member of the virus family Herpesviridae and is the most common congenital intrauterine infection. cCMV is caused when a mother is infected with CMV in pregnancy and passes it to her unborn baby. The risk of severe disease is greatest if the mother is infected in early pregnancy; most have no symptoms. Diagnosis is by tests in the first three weeks after birth; on preferably urine, although saliva and blood can be used. The chance of infection is reduced by hand washing, and avoiding touching saliva or urine of very young children.

Worldwide the condition is common, and likely underreported.

== Presentation ==
For infants who are infected by their mothers before birth, two potential adverse scenarios exist:

- Generalized infection may occur in the infant, and can cause complications such as low birth weight, microcephaly, seizures, petechial rash similar to the "blueberry muffin" rash of congenital rubella syndrome, and moderate hepatosplenomegaly (with jaundice). Though severe cases can be fatal, with supportive treatment most infants with CMV disease will survive. However, from 80% to 90% will have complications within the first few years of life that may include hearing loss, vision impairment, and varying degrees of learning disability.
- Another 5% to 10% of infants who are infected but without symptoms at birth will subsequently have varying degrees of hearing and mental or coordination problems. CMV is the most common cause of non-genetic sensorineural hearing loss in children. The onset of hearing loss can occur at any point during childhood, although commonly within the first decade. It is progressive and can affect both ears. The earlier the mother contracts the virus during pregnancy the more severe the effects are on the fetus, similarly the incidence of SNHL is dependent on which trimester of pregnancy CMV is contracted. The virus accounts for 20% of sensorineural hearing loss in children.

These risks appear to be almost exclusively associated with women who previously have not been infected with CMV and who are having their first infection with the virus during pregnancy. There appears to be little risk of CMV-related complications for women who have been infected at least 6 months prior to conception. For this group, which makes up 50% to 80% of the women of child-bearing age, the rate of newborn CMV infection is 1%, and these infants appear to have no significant illness or abnormalities.

The virus can also be transmitted to the infant at delivery from contact with genital secretions or later in infancy through breast milk. However, these infections usually result in little or no clinical illness in the infant. CMV can also be transferred through blood transfusions and close contact with large groups of children.

To summarise, during a pregnancy when a woman who has never had CMV infection becomes infected with CMV, there is a risk that after birth the infant may have CMV-related complications, the most common of which are associated with hearing loss, visual impairment, or diminished mental and motor capabilities. On the other hand, healthy infants and children who acquire CMV after birth have few, if any, symptoms or complications. However, infants born preterm and infected with CMV after birth (especially via breastmilk) may experience cognitive and motor impairments later in life.

Symptoms associated with CMV, such as hearing loss, can result in further developmental delay. A delay in general speech and language development is more common in children with CMV. Children with symptomatic CMV have been found to have a greater incidence of long-term neurological and neurodevelopmental complications than children with fetal alcohol syndrome or down syndrome.

Congenital cytomegalovirus infection can be an important cause of intraventricular hemorrhage and neonatal encephalopathy.

== Diagnosis ==
People infected with CMV develop antibodies to it, initially IgM later IgG indicating current infection and immunity respectively. The virus can be diagnosed through viral isolation, or using blood, urine, or saliva samples.

When infected with CMV, most women have no symptoms, but some may have symptoms resembling mononucleosis. Women who develop a mononucleosis-like illness during pregnancy should consult their medical provider.

The Centers for Disease Control and Prevention (CDC) does not recommend routine maternal screening for CMV infection during pregnancy because there is no test that can definitively rule out primary CMV infection during pregnancy. Women who are concerned about CMV infection during pregnancy should practice CMV prevention measures. Considering that the CMV virus is present in saliva, urine, tears, blood, mucus, and other bodily fluids, frequent hand washing with soap and water is important after contact with diapers or oral secretions, especially with a child who is in daycare or interacting with other young children on a regular basis.

A diagnosis of congenital CMV infection can be made if the virus is found in an infant's urine, saliva, blood, or other body tissues during the first week after birth. Antibody tests cannot be used to diagnose congenital CMV; a diagnosis can only be made if the virus is detected during the first week of life. Congenital CMV cannot be diagnosed if the infant is tested more than one week after birth.

Visually healthy infants are not routinely tested for CMV infection although only 10–20% will show signs of infection at birth though up to 80% may go onto show signs of prenatal infection in later life. If a pregnant woman finds out that she has become infected with CMV for the first time during her pregnancy, she should have her infant tested for CMV as soon as possible after birth.

== Prevention ==
Recommendations for pregnant women with regard to CMV infection:

- Throughout the pregnancy, practice good personal hygiene, especially handwashing with soap and water, after contact with diapers or oral secretions (particularly with a child who is in day care). Sharing of food, eating and drinking utensils, and contact with toddlers' saliva should be avoided.
- Women who develop a mononucleosis-like illness during pregnancy should be evaluated for CMV infection and counseled about the possible risks to the unborn child.
- Laboratory testing for antibody to CMV can be performed to determine if a woman has already had CMV infection.
- Recovery of CMV from the cervix or urine of women at or before the time of delivery does not warrant a cesarean section.
- The demonstrated benefits of breast-feeding outweigh the minimal risk of acquiring CMV from the breast-feeding mother.
- There is no need to either screen for CMV or exclude CMV-excreting children from schools or institutions because the virus is frequently found in many healthy children and adults.

Treating the pregnant mother with primary CMV infection by infusing hyperimmune globulin has been shown to be effective in preventing congenital disease in several older studies. One study from 2014 did not show a significant decrease in the risk of congenital cytomegalovirus infection.

=== Childcare ===
Most healthy people working with infants and children face no special risk from CMV infection. However, for women of child-bearing age who previously have not been infected with CMV, there is a potential risk to the developing unborn child (the risk is described above in the Pregnancy section). Contact with children who are in day care, where CMV infection is commonly transmitted among young children (particularly toddlers), may be a source of exposure to CMV. Since CMV is transmitted through contact with infected body fluids, including urine and saliva, child care providers (meaning day care workers, special education teachers, as well as mothers) should be educated about the risks of CMV infection and the precautions they can take. Day care workers appear to be at a greater risk than hospital and other health care providers, and this may be due in part to the increased emphasis on personal hygiene in the health care setting.

Recommendations for individuals providing care for infants and children:

- Employees should be educated concerning CMV, its transmission, and hygienic practices, such as handwashing, which minimize the risk of infection.
- Susceptible nonpregnant women working with infants and children should not routinely be transferred to other work situations.
- Pregnant women working with infants and children should be informed of the risk of acquiring CMV infection and the possible effects on the unborn child.
- Routine laboratory testing for CMV antibody in female workers is not specifically recommended due to its high occurrence, but can be performed to determine their immune status.

== Epidemiology ==
Worldwide, approximately 1 in 100 to 500 babies are born with congenital CMV. Approximately 1 in 3000 will show symptoms and 1 in 7000 will die. Congenital HCMV infection occurs when the mother has a primary infection (or reactivation) during pregnancy. Due to the lower seroprevalence of HCMV in industrialized countries and higher socioeconomic groups, congenital infections are actually less common in poorer communities, where more women of child-bearing age are already seropositive. In industrialized countries up to 8% of HCMV seronegative mothers contract primary HCMV infection during pregnancy, of which roughly 50% will transmit to the fetus. Between 10 and 15% of infected fetuses are then born with symptoms, which may include pneumonia, gastrointestinal, retinal and neurological disease. 10-15% of asymptomatic babies will develop long term neurological effects. SNHL is found in 35% of children with CMV, cognitive deficits have been found in 66% of children with CMV, and death occurs in 4% of children. HCMV infection occurs in roughly 1% of all neonates with those who are not congenitally infected contracting the infection possibly through breast milk. Other sources of neonatal infection are bodily fluids which are known to contain high titres in shedding individuals: saliva (<10^{7}copies/ml) and urine (<10^{5}copies/ml ) seem common routes of transmission.

The incidence of primary CMV infection in pregnant women in the United States varies from 1% to 3%. Healthy pregnant women are not at special risk for disease from CMV infection. When infected with CMV, most women have no symptoms and very few have a disease resembling infectious mononucleosis. It is their developing fetuses that may be at risk for congenital CMV disease. CMV remains the most important cause of congenital viral infection in the United States. HCMV is the most common cause of congenital infection in humans and intrauterine primary infections are more common than other well-known infections and syndromes, including Down Syndrome, Fetal Alcohol Syndrome, Spina Bifida, and Pediatric HIV/AIDS.

== Treatment ==
Treatment for CMV infection should start at 1 month of age and should occur for 6 months. The options for treatment are intravenous ganciclovir and oral valganciclovir. After diagnosis, it is important to further investigate any possible evidence of end-organ disease and symptoms through blood tests, imaging, ophthalmology tests, and hearing tests.
