= Constant Huygelen =

Belgian virologist (1929–2001)

- Born: Constant Alfons Huygelen; 1929; Aartselaar, Belgium
- Died: 2001 (aged 71–72); Leuven, Belgium
- Education: Ghent University
- Known for: Cendehill rubella vaccine
- Scientific career
- Fields: Virology, Veterinary medicine
- Workplaces: Veterinary Laboratory, Astrida (Rwanda); Recherche et Industrie Thérapeutiques

Constant "Stan" Alfons Huygelen (1929–2001) was a Belgian veterinarian and virologist who developed the Cendehill strain rubella vaccine, one of the first rubella vaccines licensed for use. He also contributed to early cytomegalovirus vaccine research and veterinary vaccine development.

== Early life and career ==
Huygelen graduated as Doctor of Veterinary Medicine from Ghent University in 1954 and specialized in tropical medicine at the Institute of Tropical Medicine Antwerp.

From 1957 to 1960, he served as head of the virology department at the veterinary laboratory in Astrida (now Butare), Rwanda, where he was responsible for vaccine production and the treatment of livestock diseases. In 1959, he pioneered the introduction of tissue culture techniques for virological research in Africa.

He married Lily Boeykens (1930–2005) in 1955. She later became a prominent Belgian feminist leader, serving as president of the International Council of Women from 1988 to 1994.

== Cendehill rubella vaccine ==
In 1960, Huygelen joined Recherche et Industrie Thérapeutiques (RIT) in Genval, Belgium. Working with colleagues J. Peetermans and A. Prinzie, he developed the Cendehill strain rubella vaccine by attenuating rubella virus through serial passage in primary rabbit kidney cells.

The Cendehill strain, produced at the 51st passage level, was first licensed in Switzerland in 1969, making it one of the earliest rubella vaccines approved for use.

The Cendehill vaccine was licensed in the United Kingdom and other European countries in 1970 and was widely used in the United States and Europe, particularly for adult women, until it was largely replaced by the RA27/3 vaccine strain by the late 1970s to early 1980s.

== Other research ==
Huygelen collaborated with Stanley Plotkin on the development of the Towne strain cytomegalovirus vaccine, publishing results in 1975.

Huygelen held the Francqui Chair at Ghent University during the 1973–1974 academic year, where he lectured on biology.

After retiring from industry in 1992, Huygelen became interested in the history of vaccinology, publishing papers on 18th and 19th century vaccination practices. His work included studies of Edward Jenner's smallpox vaccine and cattle immunization against rinderpest in eighteenth-century Europe. His chapter on the history of measles vaccination was published posthumously in 2011.

== Personal life ==
Huygelen and Lily Boeykens had three children: Kerstin (born 1956), Els (born 1960), and Rudy (1961–2021), who served as Belgian Ambassador to the United Kingdom and Portugal, and as Permanent Representative to NATO.

Huygelen died of cancer in Leuven in 2001.
