= Rubella =

Human viral disease

- Other names: German measles, three-day measles
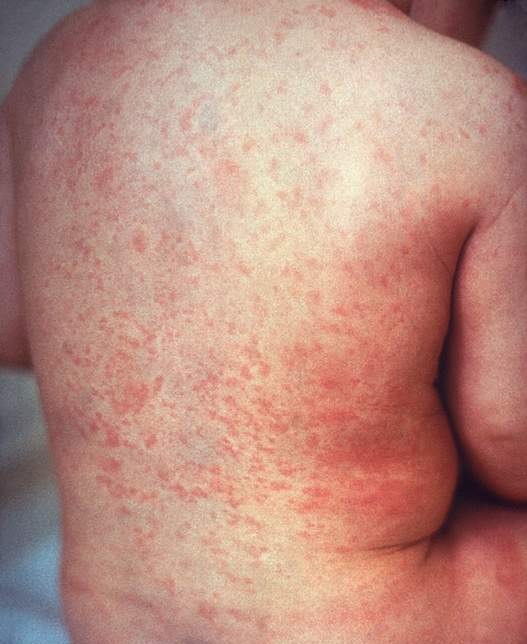
- A rash due to rubella on a child's back. The affected area is similar to that of measles, but the rash is less intensely red.
- Specialty: Infectious disease
- Symptoms: Rash, swollen lymph nodes, fever, sore throat, feeling tired
- Complications: Testicular swelling, inflammation of nerves, congenital rubella syndrome, miscarriage
- Usual onset: 2 weeks after exposure
- Duration: 3 days
- Causes: Rubella virus (spread through the air)
- Diagnostic method: Finding the virus in the blood, throat, or urine, antibody tests
- Prevention: Rubella vaccine
- Treatment: Supportive care
- Frequency: 17,865 cases (2022)

Rubella, also known as German measles or three-day measles, is a vaccine-preventable infection caused by the rubella virus. Symptoms of the disease are often mild, sometimes inapparent. A rash may appear around two weeks after exposure and last for three days, usually starting on the face then spreading to the rest of the body. The rash is sometimes itchy and is not as bright as that of measles. Swollen lymph nodes are common and may last a few weeks. A fever, sore throat, and fatigue may also occur. Joint pain is common in adults. Complications may include bleeding problems, testicular swelling, encephalitis, and inflammation of nerves. Infection during early pregnancy may result in a miscarriage or a child born with congenital rubella syndrome (CRS). Symptoms of CRS manifest as problems with the eyes such as cataracts, deafness, as well as affecting the heart and brain. Problems are rare after the 20th week of pregnancy.

Rubella is usually spread from one person to the next through the air via coughs of people who are infected. People are infectious during the week before and after the appearance of the rash. Infants born with CRS may be infectious for up to a year. Only humans are infected. Insects do not spread the disease. Once recovered, people are immune to future infections. Testing is available that can verify immunity. Diagnosis is confirmed by finding the virus in the blood, throat, or urine. Testing the blood for antibodies may also be useful.

It can be prevented by the rubella vaccine, with a single dose being more than 95% effective. Often it is given in combination with the measles vaccine and mumps vaccine, known as the MMR vaccine. When some, but less than 80%, of a population is vaccinated, more women may reach childbearing age without developing immunity by infection or vaccination, thus possibly raising CRS rates. Once infected, there is no specific treatment.

Rubella is a common infection in many areas of the world. Each year, about 100,000 cases of congenital rubella syndrome occur. Rates of disease have decreased in many areas as a result of vaccination. There are ongoing efforts to eliminate the disease globally. In April 2015, the World Health Organization declared the Americas free of rubella transmission. The name "rubella" is from Latin and means little red. It was first described as a separate disease by German physicians in 1814, resulting in the name "German measles".

== Signs and symptoms ==
Rubella can affect people of any age. Most people catch the infection in childhood, or are vaccinated, and have lifelong immunity thereafter. It is generally a mild disease, and the symptoms may be unnoticeable. However, if a woman becomes infected during early pregnancy the effect on her unborn child can be very severe.

The incubation period - between exposure to the virus, and the appearance of symptoms - ranges from 2 to 3 weeks. Some infections are asymptomatic. During the incubation period, the patient is contagious, typically for about one week before he/she develops a rash and for about one week thereafter.

The most obvious symptom of rubella is a rash, generally starting behind the ears then spreading over the rest of the body; this is less noticeable on persons with dark skin. The rash fades after a few days, which is why it is sometimes known as three-day measles. Not everybody gets the rash. Other common symptoms, especially in children, include cold-like symptoms (cough, sneezing, headaches, sore throat), swollen lymph glands behind the ear, and a mild fever. Symptoms generally clear after a few days without treatment although the swollen glands can persist for several weeks.

Adults who get the disease may suffer aching joints, arthritis, and bleeding issues caused by destruction of blood platelets.

Encephalitis is a severe but rare complication of rubella.

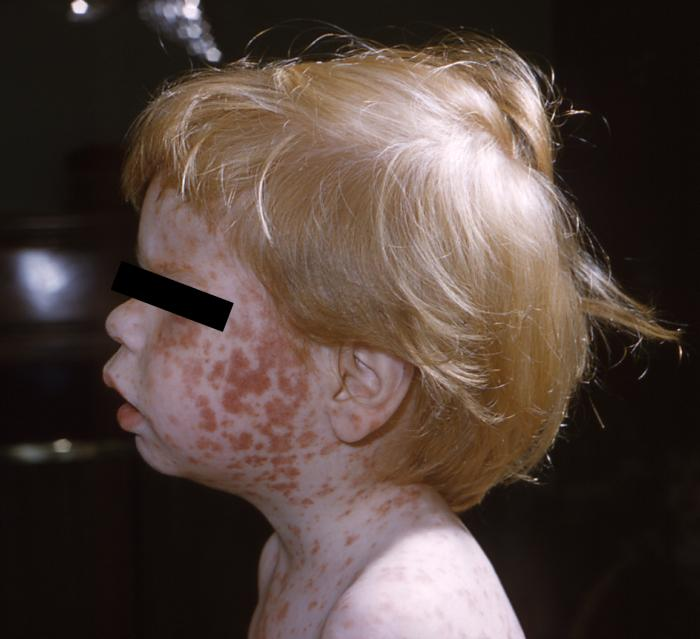
Young boy displaying the characteristic maculopapular rash of rubella

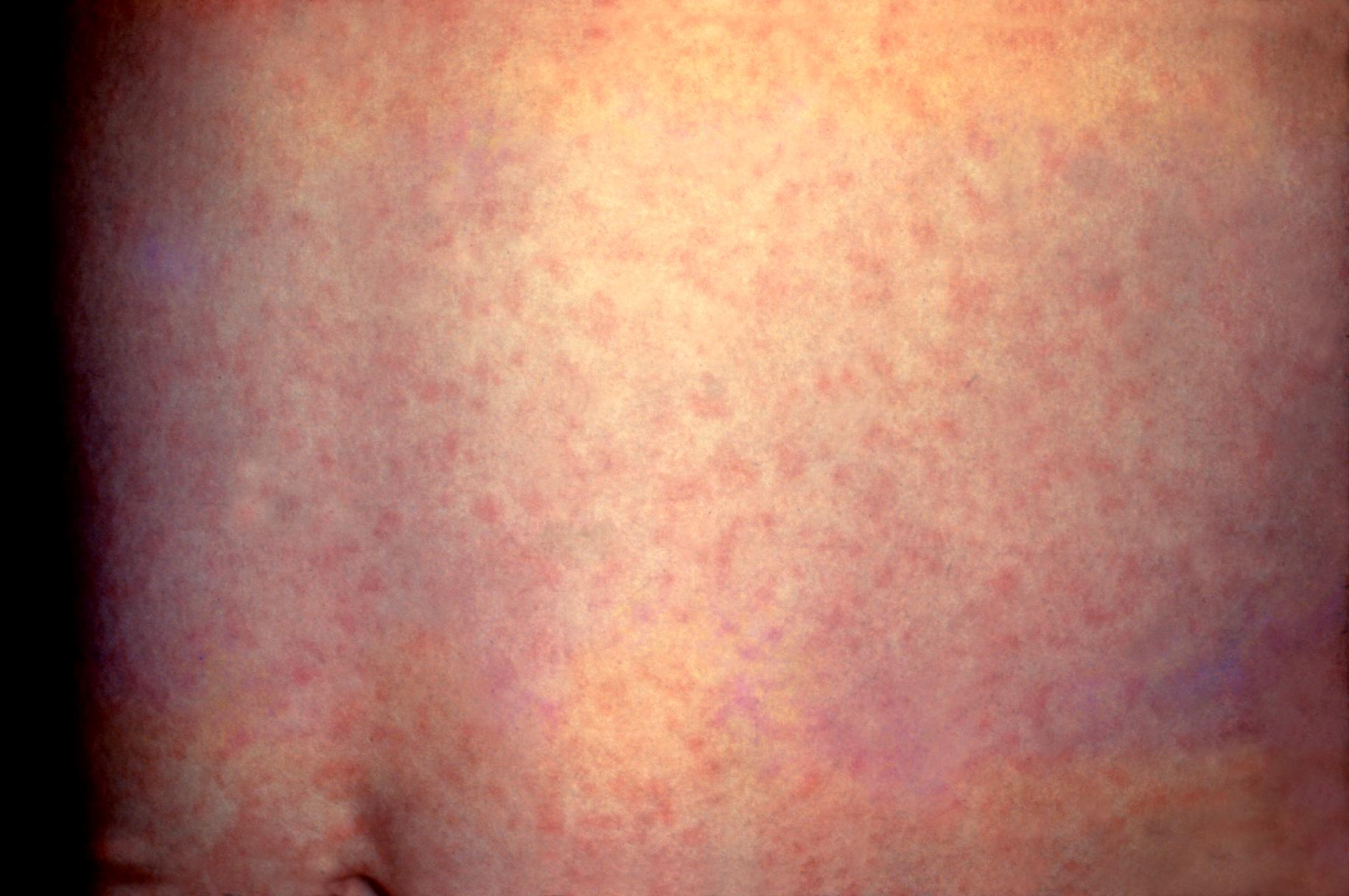
Generalized rash on the abdomen due to rubella

=== Congenital rubella ===
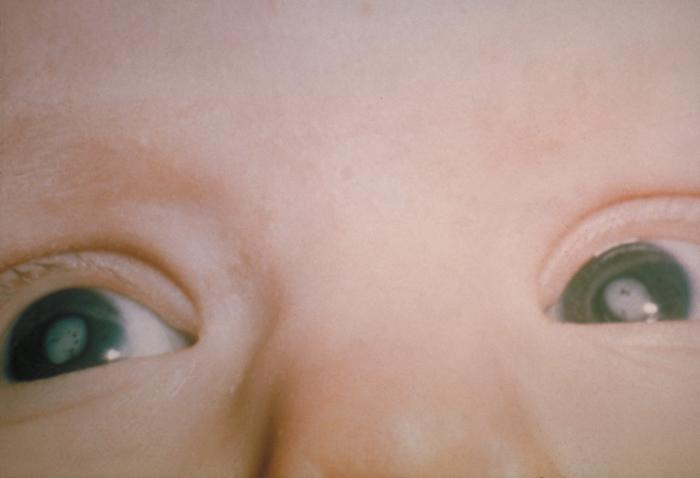
Child with cataracts in both eyes due to congenital rubella syndrome

Rubella can cause congenital rubella syndrome (CRS) in the newborn; it is the most severe sequela of rubella. CRS occurs when a pregnant woman is infected with rubella and transmits the virus to her unborn fetus. This can cause birth defects, most commonly affecting the ophthalmologic, cardiac, auditory, and neurological systems. It may also cause stillbirth, prematurity, or low birth weight.

The most frequent symptoms of CRS - often described as a triad - are:

- Deafness (the most common, sometimes the only symptom).
- Cataract
- Congenital heart disease

The risk is highest if the infection occurs during the first trimester of pregnancy. CRS is the main reason a rubella vaccine was developed.

As of 2019 it is estimated that 32,000 cases of this condition occur globally each year, the vast majority of them in regions with poor or no vaccine coverage.

== Cause ==
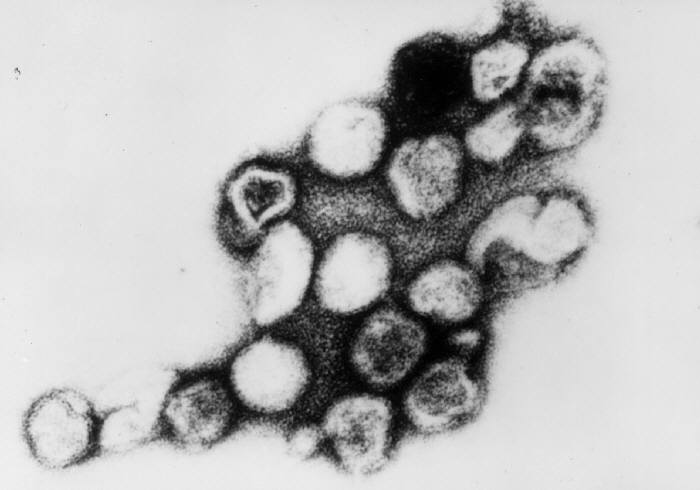
Transmission electron micrograph of rubella viruses

The disease is caused by the rubella virus, in the genus Rubivirus from the family Matonaviridae, that is enveloped and has a single-stranded RNA genome. Transmission is via inhaling respiratory droplets exhaled by an infected person. It initially replicates in the nasopharynx and lymph nodes. The virus is found in the blood 5 to 7 days after infection and spreads throughout the body. It can cross the placenta and infect the fetus, affecting tissues and organs at an early stage of development (teratogenesis).

== Diagnosis ==
Diagnosis of rubella is not easy, as the symptoms are non-specific and usually mild. Laboratory testing a blood sample for rubella specific antibodies is the preferred test. Immunoglobulin M antibodies reach their peak a few days after the rash appears, but decline and are undetectable after 8 weeks. Immunoglobulin G antibodies persist throughout life.

== Prevention ==
Rubella number unvaccinated

Rubella infections are prevented by active immunization programs using live attenuated virus vaccines. Two live attenuated virus vaccines, RA 27/3 and Cendehill strains, were effective in preventing adult disease. However, their use in prepubertal females did not produce a significant fall in the overall incidence rate of CRS in the UK. Reductions were achieved through immunisation of all children.

The vaccine is usually given as part of the MMR vaccine. The WHO recommends the first dose be given at 12 to 18 months of age with a second dose at 36 months. Pregnant women are usually tested for immunity to rubella early on. Women found to be susceptible are not vaccinated until after the baby is born because the vaccine contains a live virus.

The immunisation program has been quite successful. Cuba declared the disease eliminated in the 1990s, and in 2004 the Centers for Disease Control and Prevention announced that both the congenital and acquired forms of rubella had been eliminated from the United States. The World Health Organization declared Australia rubella-free in October 2018.

Screening for rubella susceptibility by history of vaccination or by serology is recommended in the United States for all women of childbearing age at their first preconception counseling visit to reduce incidence of congenital rubella syndrome (CRS). It is recommended that all susceptible non-pregnant women of childbearing age should be offered rubella vaccination. Due to concerns about possible teratogenicity, use of MMR vaccine is not recommended during pregnancy. Instead, susceptible pregnant women should be vaccinated as soon as possible in the postpartum period.

In susceptible people, passive immunization, in the form of polyclonal immunoglobulins, appears effective up to the fifth day post-exposure.

== Treatment ==
There is no specific treatment for rubella; for mild cases, supportive care may be appropriate to diminish discomfort. Treatment of newborns affected by CRS focuses on managing complications, and reducing risk to others if they are infective.

== Prognosis ==
Rubella infection in children and adults is usually mild, self-limiting, and often asymptomatic. The prognosis in children born with CRS is poor.

== Epidemiology ==
About 17,865 cases of rubella occurred in 78 countries in 2022, a decrease of 97% from the year 2000. Rubella has been eliminated in the Americas since 2015 and 50 of 53 countries of Europe. As of 2024, 117 countries have eliminated the disease.

Before the vaccine against rubella was introduced in 1969, widespread outbreaks usually occurred every 6–9 years in the United States and 3–5 years in Europe, mostly affecting children in the 5-9-year-old age group. Since the introduction of vaccine, occurrences have become rare in those countries with high uptake rates.

Vaccination has interrupted the transmission of rubella in the Americas: no endemic case has been observed since February 2009. Vaccination is still strongly recommended as the virus could be reintroduced from other continents should vaccination rates in the Americas drop. During the epidemic in the US between 1962 and 1965, rubella virus infections during pregnancy were estimated to have caused 30,000 stillbirths and 20,000 children to be born impaired or disabled as a result of CRS. Universal immunisation producing a high level of herd immunity is important in the control of epidemics of rubella.

Outbreaks still arise, usually in developing countries where the vaccine is not as accessible. The complications encountered in pregnancy from rubella infection (miscarriage, fetal death, congenital rubella syndrome) are more common in Africa and Southeast Asia at a rate of 121 per 100,000 live births compared to 2 per 100,000 live births in the Americas and Europe.

== History ==
Rubella was first described in the mid-eighteenth century. German physician and chemist, Friedrich Hoffmann, made the first clinical description of rubella in 1740, which was confirmed by De Bergen in 1752 and Orlow in 1758. In 1814, George de Maton first suggested that it be considered a disease distinct from both measles and scarlet fever. All these physicians were German, and the disease was known as Rötheln (contemporary German Röteln). (Rötlich means "reddish" or "pink" in German.) The fact that three Germans first described it led to the common name of "German measles."

Henry Veale, an English Royal Artillery surgeon, described an outbreak in India. He coined the name "rubella" (from the Latin word, meaning "little red") in 1866.

It was formally recognised as an individual entity in 1881, at the International Congress of Medicine in London. In 1914, Alfred Fabian Hess theorised that rubella was caused by a virus, based on work with monkeys. In 1938, Hiro and Tosaka confirmed this by passing the disease to children using filtered nasal washings from acute cases.

In 1940, there was a widespread epidemic of rubella in Australia. Subsequently, ophthalmologist Norman McAllister Gregg found 78 cases of congenital cataracts in infants, and 68 of them were born to mothers who had caught rubella in early pregnancy. Gregg published an account, Congenital Cataract Following German Measles in the Mother, in 1941. He described a variety of problems later known as congenital rubella syndrome (CRS) and noticed that the earlier the mother was infected, the worse the damage was. Since no vaccine was yet available, some popular magazines promoted the idea of "German measles parties" for infected children to spread the disease to other children (especially girls) to immunize them for life and protect them from later catching the disease when pregnant. The virus was isolated in tissue culture in 1962 by two separate groups led by physicians Paul Douglas Parkman and Thomas Huckle Weller.

There was a pandemic of rubella between 1962 and 1965, starting in Europe and spreading to the United States. In the years 1964–65, the United States had an estimated 12.5 million rubella cases (1964–1965 rubella epidemic). This led to 11,000 miscarriages or therapeutic abortions and 20,000 cases of congenital rubella syndrome. Of these, 2,100 died as neonates, 12,000 were deaf, 3,580 were blind, and 1,800 were intellectually disabled. In New York alone, CRS affected 1% of all births.

In 1967, the molecular structure of rubella was observed under electron microscopy using antigen-antibody complexes by Jennifer M. Best, June Almeida, J E Banatvala and A P Waterson.

In 1969, a live attenuated virus vaccine was licensed. In the early 1970s, a triple vaccine containing attenuated measles, mumps, and rubella (MMR) viruses was introduced. By 2006, confirmed cases in the Americas had dropped below 3000 a year. However, a 2007 outbreak in Argentina, Brazil, and Chile pushed the cases to 13,000 that year.

=== Eradication efforts ===
On January 22, 2014, the World Health Organization (WHO) and the Pan American Health Organization declared and certified Colombia free of rubella and became the first Latin American country to eliminate the disease within its borders. On April 29, 2015, the Americas became the first WHO region to officially eradicate the disease. The last non-imported cases occurred in 2009 in Argentina and Brazil. The Pan American Health Organization director remarked, "The fight against rubella has taken more than 15 years, but it has paid off with what I believe will be one of the most important pan-American public health achievements of the 21st Century." The declaration was made after 165 million health records and genetically confirming that imported strains of the virus caused all recent cases. Rubella is still common in some regions of the world and Susan E. Reef, team lead for rubella at the CDC's global immunization division, who joined in the announcement, said there was no chance it would be eradicated worldwide before 2020. Rubella is the third disease to be eliminated from the Western Hemisphere with vaccination after smallpox and polio.

== Etymology ==
Rubella - from "rubrum", the Latin for "red", the word means "little red" referring to the typical mild rash. The disease was first described by a group of German doctors, leading to the name "German Measles" in English.

The name rubella is sometimes confused with rubeola, an alternative name for measles in English-speaking countries; the diseases are unrelated. In some other European languages, like Spanish, rubella and rubeola are synonyms, and rubeola is not an alternative name for measles. Thus, in Spanish, rubeola refers to rubella and sarampión refers to measles.

== See also ==
- Blueberry muffin baby
- Eradication of infectious diseases
- Exanthema subitum (roseola infantum)
