= Blue rubber bleb nevus syndrome =

- Other names: BRBNS, or Blue rubber bleb syndrome, or Blue rubber-bleb nevus or Bean syndrome
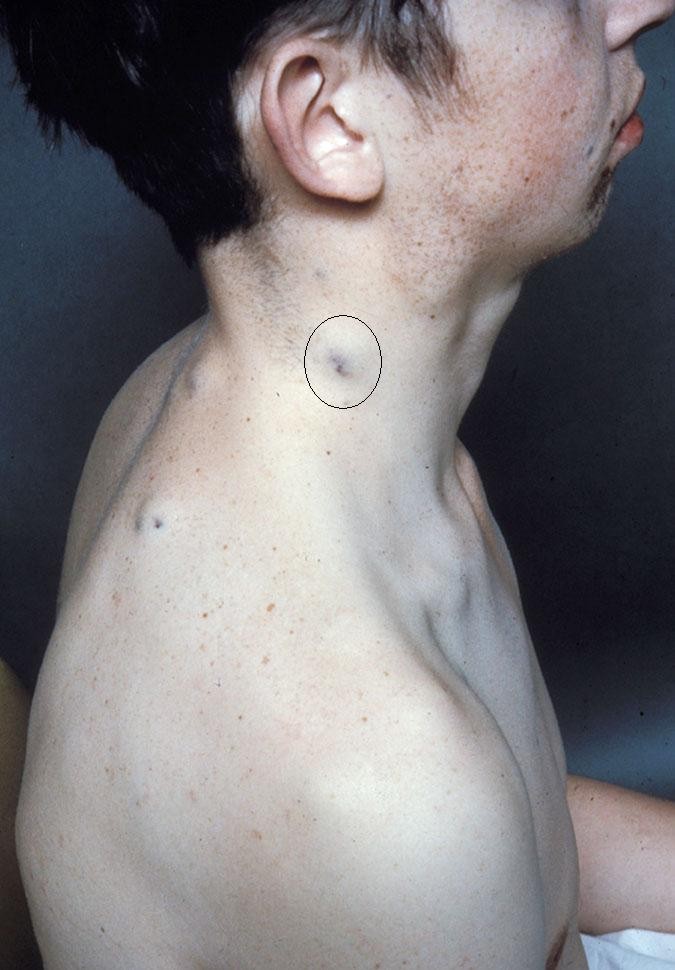
- The cutaneous vascular malformations of blue rubber bleb nevus syndrome
- Specialty: Oncology

Blue rubber bleb nevus syndrome is a rare disorder that consists mainly of abnormal blood vessels affecting the skin or internal organs – usually the gastrointestinal tract. The disease is characterized by the presence of fluid-filled blisters (blebs) as visible, circumscribed, chronic lesions (nevi).

BRBNS is caused by somatic mutations in the TEK (TIE2) gene. It was described by William Bennett Bean in 1958.

== Presentation ==
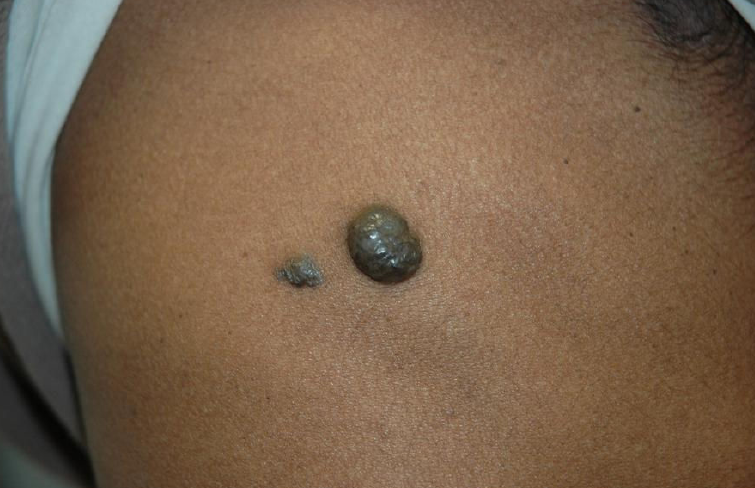
Cutaneous manifestation of blue rubber bleb nevus syndrome

BRBNS is a venous malformation, formerly, though incorrectly, thought to be related to the hemangioma. It sometimes causes serious bleeding. Lesions are most commonly found on the skin and in the small intestine and distal large bowel. The lesions can also be found in the central nervous system, liver, and muscles. It usually presents soon after birth or during early infancy.

== Causes ==
The cause of blue rubber bleb nevus syndrome is currently unknown. The syndrome is considered sporadic. A patient who is diagnosed with BRBNS likely has a family history of other multifocal venous malformations which are a symptom of the disease. Autosomal inheritance of BRBNS has been found in familial cases associated with chromosome 9p, but the majority of cases are sporadic. The disease correlates with an onset of GI complications. It is reported that GI bleeding is the most common cause of death in most cases.

== Diagnosis ==
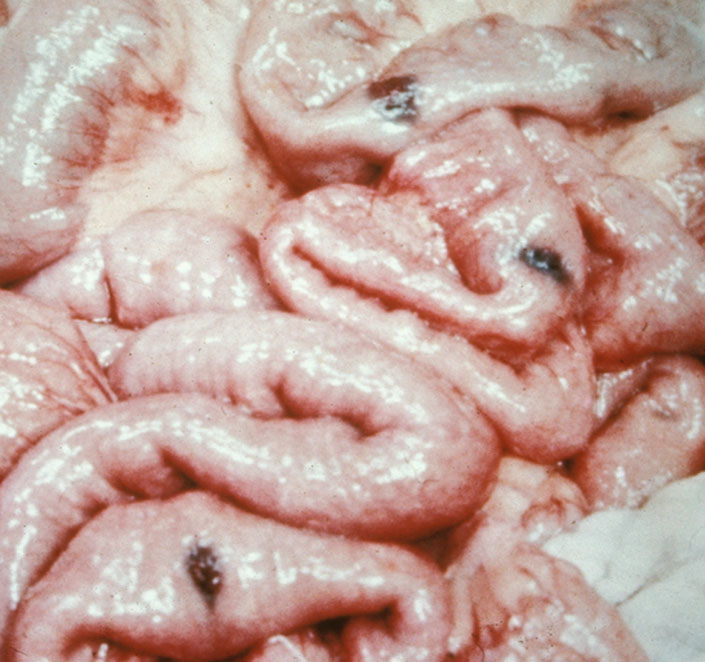
Visceral venous malformations seen in blue rubber bleb nevus syndrome. Lesions chiefly affect the gut (image above), are fragile, and bleed easily.

Blue rubber bleb nevus syndrome is difficult to diagnose because of how rare the disease is. Diagnosis is usually based on the presence of cutaneous lesions with or without gastrointestinal bleeding and/or involvement of other organs. Cutaneous angiomas are found on the surface of the skin and from the scalp to the soles of feet. The lesions are rubbery, soft, tender and hemorrhagic, easily compressible and promptly refill after compression. A physical examination is mostly used to diagnosis cutaneous angiomas on the surface of the skin. Endoscopy has been the leading diagnostic tool for diagnosing BRBNS for those who have lesions in the gastrointestinal tract. The GI tract is illuminated and visualized in endoscopy. Endoscopy also allows immediate therapeutic measures like argon plasma, coagulation, laser photocoagulation, sclerotherapy, or band ligation. Besides physical examination and endoscopy, ultrasonography, radiographic images, CT and magnetic resonance imaging are helpful for detection of affected visceral organs.

== Treatment ==
There are several methods to treat BRBNS, although it is not a curable disease. Treatment depends on the severity and location of affected areas. The cutaneous lesions can be effectively treated by laser, surgical removal, electrodesiccation, cryotherapy, and sclerotherapy. In other cases, iron therapy (such as iron supplementation) and blood transfusions are used to conservatively manage BRBNS because of the amount of blood that is lost from the GI bleeding. It is not necessary to remove the lesions in the gastrointestinal system unless the bleeding leads to anemia and repeated blood transfusions. It is safe to remove GI lesions surgically, but one or more lengthy procedures may be required. If there is a recurrence with new angioma in the gastrointestinal tract, laser-steroid therapy is needed. Treatment is not required for those with skin spots, but some individuals with BRBNS may want treatment for cosmetic reasons or if the affected location causes discomfort or affects normal function.

== Incidence ==
Blue Rubber Bleb Nevus Syndrome affects males and females in equal numbers. According to a review of literature, 20% of patients with BRBNS were from the United States, 15% from Japan, 9% from Spain, 9% from Germany, 6% from China, and 6% from France; and a lower number of cases from other countries.

== See also ==
- Bart syndrome
- List of cutaneous conditions
