= Harry M. Meyer =

American pediatric virologist

Harry M. Meyer (died August 19, 2001) was an American pediatric virologist. He who played a central role in the development of the Rubella vaccine.
