= Hope E. Hopps =

American microbiologist and immunologist

Hope Elizabeth Hopps
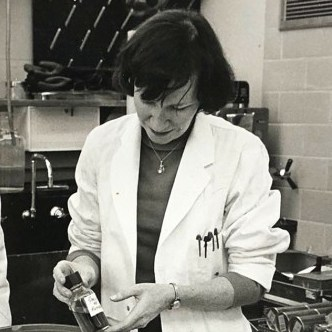
- Hope E Hopps with Rubella antigen
- Born: June 15, 1926; West Warwick, Rhode Island
- Died: November 7, 1988 (aged 62); Washington, D.C.
- Education: University of Rhode Island (B.Sc., 1947); University of Maryland (M.S. Microbiology, 1950)
- Spouse: George Hopps
- Scientific career
- Fields: Infectious Diseases, Microbiology, Immunology, Cell Biology, Vaccine Development
- Workplaces: US Food and Drug Administration

Hope Elizabeth Hopps (June 15, 1926 – November 7, 1988) was an American microbiologist and immunologist who retired from the US Food and Drug Administration having served as assistant director of the Bureau of Biologics. She published 89 articles in scientific journals and books, and was awarded two patents related to vaccine development.

The Society for In Vitro Biology established the Hope E. Hopps Award, for outstanding students of in-vitro biology.

== Education ==
Hopps earned her undergraduate degree from University of Rhode Island and in 1950 her master's degree in microbiology from the University of Maryland.

== Career ==
Initially a bacteriologist at Garfield Memorial Hospital, she went on to do research at Walter Reed Army Institute of Research. She moved to the National Institute of Allergy and Infectious Diseases in 1956, then to the National Institutes of Health's Division of Biological Standards (which because the Bureau of Biologics in 1972) in 1960, where she served as assistant to the director.

== Research ==
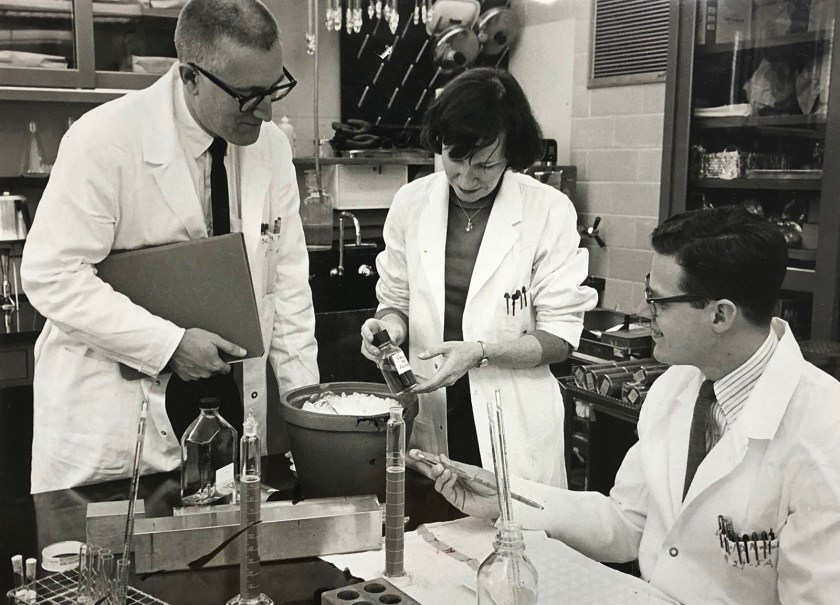
NIH photo labelled as "Drs. Harry M. Meyer, Jr. (light hair), Paul D. Parkman (dark hair), and a female lab technician (sic) of the Laboratory of Viral Immunology, Division of Biologics Standard [sic] working with rubella antigen in laboratory setting."

Hopps developed a continuous grivet monkey kidney cell line to help create a live poliovirus vaccine. She discovered the ability of rickettsiae to produce interferon. She also helped study the attenuated rubella virus.

She later worked with Harry M. Meyer, Jr. and Paul D. Parkman on the Rubella vaccine although her role was not given full credit. She was included as a co-author on papers and jointly held a patent for the rubella blood test with Meyer and Parkman. The discovery however was credited to Meyer and Parkman. Despite this she was called a "Girl Friday" and an NIH photograph described her as a "female technician". She was credited with the "first practical procedure for wide-scale evaluation of rubella immunity".

She was elected national president of Graduate Women in Science in 1972. She was active in the Tissue Culture Association (TCA), now known as the Society for In Vitro Biology (SIVB), serving as president of the Washington, D.C. chapter from 1974 until 1975, national vice-president from 1978 until 1980, and was a member of its council and occasionally its executive board from 1974 until 1988. She chaired the publications committee and established a new name and format for the society's journal, In Vitro Cellular & Developmental Biology.

== Private life ==
She married George Hopps and they lived in Silver Spring. She died of cancer at age 62.

== Legacy ==
The Society for In Vitro Biology established the Hope E. Hopps Award in her honor, for students who demonstrate outstanding achievements in the field of in vitro biology.

In 2018 the NIH were amending their records of "female technician" in photographs to add her name.
