= Congenital rubella syndrome =

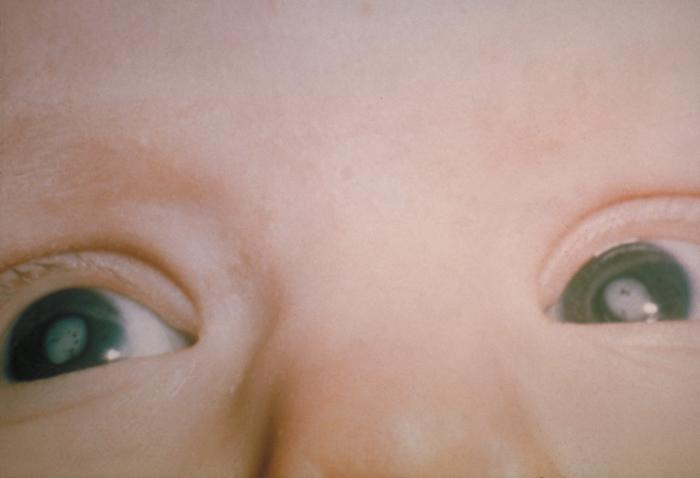
- White pupils due to congenital cataracts in a child with congenital rubella syndrome
- Specialty: Teratology
- Prevention: Vaccinating the majority of the population

Congenital rubella syndrome (CRS) occurs when a human fetus is infected with the rubella virus (German measles) via maternal-fetal transmission and develops birth defects, most commonly affecting the ophthalmologic, cardiac, auditory, and neurological systems.

Rubella infection in pregnancy can result in various outcomes ranging in severity from normal, to CRS, to miscarriage and fetal death. The risk is highest if the infection occurs during the first trimester of pregnancy. Diagnosis of CRS is made through a series of clinical and laboratory findings, and management is based on the infant's clinical presentation.

CRS can be prevented by means of rubella vaccination. Immunity to rubella, once acquired, is lifelong. Vaccination programs generally employ the MMR vaccine, with the first dose administered during the first year of life.

Congenital rubella syndrome was first described in 1941 by Australian ophthalmologist Norman McAlister Gregg, who noted an unusual frequency of cataracts in newborns after a rubella epidemic.

== Signs and symptoms ==
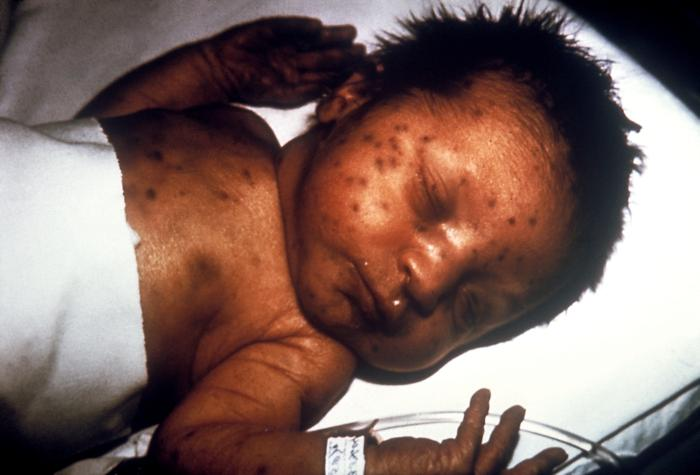
New-born infant with "blueberry muffin" appearance from CRS.

The most frequent symptoms of CRS - often described as a triad - are:

- Deafness (the most common, sometimes the only symptom).
- Cataract
- Congenital heart disease

Some symptoms are transient, and may resolve over the first few weeks of life. These include low birth weight, enlarged liver and spleen, low blood platelet count (possibly associated with a blueberry muffin rash), and jaundice.

More serious long-term complications can include:

- Neurological: intellectual disability or delay, small head size (microcephaly), behavioural disorders, autism.
- Ophthalmic: glaucoma, retinopathy.
- With delayed onset: diabetes, thyroid disease.

=== Congenital rubella infection ===
The term congenital rubella infection describes the infection which leads to CRS. Infants infected during pregnancy commonly carry rubella virus (whether or not they have symptoms of CRS), and may shed the virus in respiratory secretions and urine for up to a year.

== Diagnosis ==
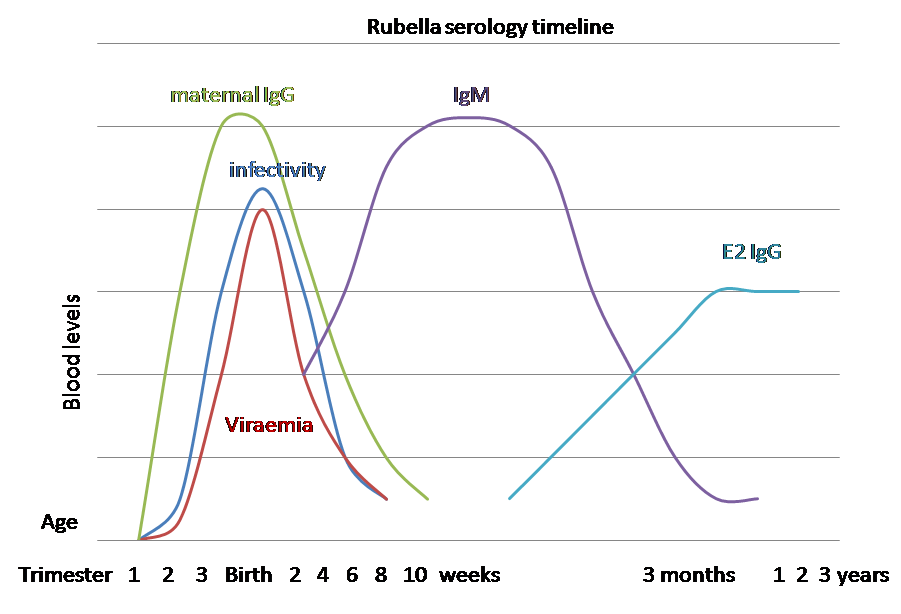
Congenital rubella serology timeline

Diagnosis of congenital rubella syndrome is made based on clinical findings and laboratory criteria. Laboratory criteria include at least one of the following:

- Detection of the rubella virus via RT-PCR
- Detection of rubella-specific IgM antibody
- Detection of infant rubella-specific IgG antibody at higher levels (and persists for a longer time) than expected for passive maternal transmission
- Isolation of the rubella virus by nasal, blood, throat, urine, or cerebrospinal fluid specimens

Findings in the following categories characterize the clinical definition:

1. Cataracts/congenital glaucoma, congenital heart disease (most commonly, patent ductus arteriosus or peripheral pulmonary artery stenosis), hearing impairment, pigmentary retinopathy
2. Purpura, hepatosplenomegaly, jaundice, microcephaly, developmental delay, meningoencephalitis, radiolucent bone disease

A patient is classified into the following cases depending on their clinical and laboratory findings:

- Suspected: A patient that has one or more of the clinical findings listed above but does not meet the definition for probable or confirmed classification
- Probable: A patient that does not have laboratory confirmation of congenital rubella but has either two clinical findings from Group 1 as listed above, OR one clinical finding from Group 1 and one clinical finding from Group 2 as listed above
- Confirmed: A patient with at least one laboratory finding and one clinical finding (from either group) as listed above
- Infection only: A patient with no clinical findings as described above, but meeting at least one confirmed laboratory criterion

== Prevention ==
Vaccination is effective in preventing congenital rubella syndrome, preferably in the form of the MMR (measles, mumps, rubella) vaccination given in the first year of life. As an example. since the introduction of the rubella vaccine in 1969, rubella incidence in the United States decreased 57,686 cases in 1969 to 271 cases in 1999, with a corresponding reduction in infants born with CRS. For women without immunity, vaccination is recommended at least 28 days before conception.

== Management ==
There are no medications or antivirals that will shorten the clinical course of the virus. Many infants can be born with multiple birth defects that require multidisciplinary management and interventions based on clinical manifestations. Often, these infants will require an extended period or lifelong follow-up with medical specialists. Early diagnosis of congenital rubella syndrome is important for planning future medical care and educational placement.

=== Auditory care ===
Many infants with CRS may be born with sensorineural deafness and thus should undergo a newborn hearing evaluation. Hearing loss may not be apparent at birth and thus requires close auditory follow-up. Infants with confirmed hearing impairment may require hearing aids and may benefit from an early intervention program.

=== Ophthalmologic care ===
Eye abnormalities, including cataracts, infantile glaucoma, and retinopathy, are common in infants born with CRS. Infants should undergo eye examinations after birth and during early childhood. Those with congenital eye defects require care from a pediatric ophthalmologist for specialized care and follow-up.

=== Cardiac care ===
Congenital cardiac anomalies, including pulmonary artery stenosis and patent ductus arteriosus, can be seen in infants with CRS. Infants should undergo cardiac evaluation soon after birth, and those with confirmed cardiac lesions will require specialized care with a pediatric cardiologist for any interventions and follow-up care.

== See also ==
- Jay Horwitz (born 1945), New York Mets executive born with the syndrome
