= Hamida =

Hamida is an Arabic given name that means praiseworthy, and it is the feminine form of the name Hamid. In Azerbaijani it becomes Həmidə. It may refer to:

== People ==
- DJ Hamida (born 1986), Moroccan DJ and record producer based in France

=== Given name ===
- Hamida Addèche (born 1932), French long-distance runner
- Hamida al-Attas (born 1934), the mother of Osama bin Laden
- Hamida Banu (died 2024), Indian sprinter
- Hamida Banu Begum (1527–1604), wife of the second Mughal Emperor, Humayun, and the mother of Mughal Emperor, Akbar
- Hamida Banu Shova (born 1954), founder and chairperson of Queens University, Bangladesh
- Hamida Barmaki (1970–2011) Afghan law professor and human rights activist
- Hamida Djandoubi (1949–1977), the last person to be guillotined in France, at Baumettes Prison in Marseille
- Hamida Ghafour (born 1977), Canadian journalist and author of Afghan origin
- Hamida Habibullah (1916–2018), Indian parliamentarian, educationist and social worker
- Hamida Al-Habsi (born 1987), Omani shot putter and discus thrower
- Hamida Javanshir (1873–1955), Azerbaijani philanthropist and women's rights activist
- Hamida Khuhro (1936–2017), Pakistani politician and historian Sindh government minister
- Hamida Nana (born 1946), Syrian writer and journalist
- Hamida Rania Nefsi (born 1997), Algerian swimmer
- Hamida Omarova (born 1957), Azerbaijani actress
- Hamida Pahalwan (1907–1984), Indian wrestler in Radhanpur during the 1930s

=== Middle name ===
- K. J. Hamida Khanam (1940–2015), Bangladeshi politician.

=== Ben / Bin / Bani / Banu Hamida ===
- Bani Hamida, a semi-nomadic bedouin tribe that controlled much of the land East of the Dead Sea before the establishment of the emirate of Transjordan
- Adil Mabrouk Bin Hamida, citizen of Tunisia, former extrajudicial detainee at the U.S. Guantanamo Bay detainment camps, in Cuba
- Mongi Ben Hamida (1928–2003), Tunisian neurologist and neuropsychiatrist

== Fictional characters ==
- Ĥamida, a character in the film A Girl Named Maĥmood

== See also ==
- Hamidah (disambiguation)
