= Louis Manceaux =

Louis Herbert Manceaux
- Born: 1865
- Died: 1934 (aged 68–69)
- Known for: Co-discovery of Toxoplasma gondii with Charles Nicolle
- Scientific career
- Fields: Parasitology, Medicine
- Institutions: Pasteur Institute of Tunis, Pasteur Institute

Louis Herbert Manceaux (1865–1934) was a French physician, parasitologist, and co-discover of Toxoplasma gondii with Charles Nicolle in 1908.

== Biography ==
Manceaux's life is not well known, but he was a physician-scientist recruited by Charles Nicolle to study at the Pasteur Institute of Tunis. He assisted Nicolle with capturing gundi in the Djerid Desert to study a parasite associated with a disease known as oriental sore in North Africa. The parasite observed in the tissue samples rodents was originally named Leishmania gondii in 1908. Upon further analysis, they concluded that the parasite was a newly discovered genus, so it was renamed to Toxoplasma gondii in 1909. After his discovery, Manceaux served as a French military doctor and was on active duty with medical corps during World War I. After retiring from the Army, he went on to work for the Pasteur Intstitute of Paris and practice medicine in Paris.

== Works ==
1908, Sur une infection a corps de Leishman (on organismes voisons) du gondi, Nicolle C, Manceaux L

1909, Sur un protozoaire nouveau du gondi, Nicolle C, Manceaux L
