= Habib Bourguiba bibliography =

The Habib Bourguiba bibliography includes major books about President Habib Bourguiba of Tunisia, his biography, presidency and policies.

== Biographies ==
- Bessis, Sophie; Belhassen, Souhayr (2012), Bourguiba (in French), Tunis: Elyzad, ISBN 978-9973-58-044-3
- Conte, Arthur (1978), La légende de Bourguiba (in French), Paris: Média Editions
- Kamoun, Maher (2015), Habib Bourguiba (1903–2000). Ombres et lumières (in French), Tunis: Kamoun Editions
- Martel, Pierre-Albin (1999), Habib Bourguiba. Un homme, un siècle (in French), Jaguar Editions, ISBN 978-2-86950-320-5
- Mouhli, Alan (2016), Habib Bourguiba: Leader between fail and success, London: Mouhli Editions
- Pautard, André (1977), Bourguiba (in French), Paris: Média Editions
- Jean, Rous (1984), Habib Bourguiba (in French), Paris: Martinsart Editions, ISBN 978-2-86345-235-6
- Saïd, Safi (2000), Bourguiba : une biographie quasi interdite (in Arabic), Beyrouth: Riad El Rayes Books Editions

== Fight for independence ==
- Dimassi, Ali (1979), Habib Bourguiba, l'apôtre de la liberté tunisienne (in French), Sousse: Contraste Editions
- El Ganari, Ali (1985), Bourguiba. Le Combattant suprême (in French), Paris: Plon Editions, ISBN 978-2-259-01321-5
- Félix, Garas (1956), Bourguiba et la naissance d'une nation (in French), Paris: Julliard Editions
- El Mechat, Samya (2000), Tunisie. Les chemins vers l'indépendance (1945–1956) (in French), Paris: L'Harmattan Editions, ISBN 978-2-913281-55-4

== Presidency ==
- Borsali, Noura (2008), Bourguiba à l'épreuve de la démocratie. 1956–1963 (in French), Tunis: Samed Editions
- Belkhodja, Tahar [in French] (1998), Les trois décennies Bourguiba. Témoignage (in French), Paris: Publisud, ISBN 978-2-84342-011-5
- Ben Salah, Ahmed (2008), Pour rétablir la vérité. Réformes et développement en Tunisie. 1961–1969 (in French), Tunis: Cérès Editions, ISBN 978-9973-19-726-9
- Charfi, Mounir (1989), Les ministres de Bourguiba (1956–1987) (in French), Paris: L'Harmattan Editions, ISBN 2-7384-0398-0
- Caid Essebsi, Beji (2009), Bourguiba. Le bon grain et l'ivraie (in French), Tunis: Sud Editions, ISBN 978-9973-844-99-6
- Abbassi, Driss; Ilbert, Robert (2005), Entre Bourguiba et Hannibal. Identité tunisienne et histoire depuis l'indépendance (in French), Paris: Karthala Editions, ISBN 978-2-84586-640-9
- Abbès, Mohamed Hachemi (2014), Bourguiba et Nouira. Souvenirs et mémoires (in French), Paris: L'Harmattan Editions
- Bouguerra, Abdeljalil (2012), Le régime bourguibien : la montée et la régression (in Arabic), Tunis: Perspectives Editions
- Chadli, Amor (2010), Bourguiba tel que je l'ai connu : la transition Bourguiba-Ben Ali (in Arabic), Tunis: Berg Edition, ISBN 978-9973-02-225-7
- Hopwood, Derek (28 July 1992), Habib Bourguiba of Tunisia: the tragedy of longevity, Oxford: Macmillan and St Antony's College Editions, ISBN 978-0-333-57262-7
- Klibi, Chedli (2012), Habib Bourguiba. Radioscopie d'un règne (in French), Tunis: Déméter Editions, ISBN 978-9973-706-26-3
- Khlifi, Omar (2001), Bizerte. La guerre de Bourguiba (in French), Carthage: MC-Editions
- Kooli, Mongi (1999), Au service de la République, sous l'égide de Bourguiba (in French), Tunis: Cérès Editions
- Mosbahi, Hassouna (2012), Voyage dans l'ère bourguibienne (in Arabic), Tunis: Perspectives Editions
- Mestiri, Ahmed (2011), Témoignage pour l'Histoire (in French), Tunis: Sud Editions
- Moalla, Mansour (1993), L'État tunisien et l'indépendance (in French), Tunis: Cérès Editions
- Rossi, Pierre (1967), Bourguiba's Tunisia, London: Kahia Editions
- Mzali, Mohamed (2004), Un Premier ministre de Bourguiba témoigne (in French), Paris: Picollec Editions, ISBN 978-2-86477-210-1
- Sayah, Mohamed (2012), L'Acteur et le témoin (in Arabic), Tunis: Cérès Editions
- Aleya Sghaier, Amira (2011), Bourguiba 1er. Le despote (in Arabic), Tunis: MIPE Editions
- Timoumi, Hédi (2011), La Tunisie de 1956 à 1987 (in French), Tunis: Cenatra Editions
- Toumi, Mohsen (1989), La Tunisie de Bourguiba à Ben Ali (in French), Paris: Presses universitaires de France Editions, ISBN 978-2-13-042804-6

== Personal life ==
- Bourguiba, Habib Jr. (2013), Notre histoire. Entretiens avec Mohamed Kerrou (in French), Tunis: Cérès Editions

== Political thought and policies ==
- Ben Belghith, Chibani (2009), Bourguiba et les Waqfs (in Arabic), Tunis: Aladdin Editions
- Cohen, Bernard (1992), Bourguiba. Le pouvoir d'un seul (in French), Paris: Flammarion Editions
- Dachraoui, Farhat (2013), Bourguiba : pouvoir et contre-pouvoir (in French), Tunis: Nirvana Editions
- Hadded, Khaled (2008), Bourguiba et les médias (in Arabic), Tunis: Carthage Editions
- Hadded, Salem (2011), L'Union générale tunisienne du travail et le régime de Bourguiba (in Arabic), Tunis: UGTT Editions
- Hajji, Lotfi (2011), Bourguiba et l'Islam : le politique et le religieux (in French), Tunis: Sud Editions, ISBN 978-9938-01-044-2
- Moussa, Amal (2011), Bourguiba et la question religieuse (in Arabic), Tunis: Cérès Editions
- Ruf, Werner (1969), Der Burgibismus und die Außenpolitik des unabhängigen Tunesien (in German), Gütersloh: Bertelsmann Universitätsverlag Editions
- Zaghouani-Dhaouadi, Henda (2011), Le pèlerinage oriental de Habib Bourguiba. Essai sur une philosophie politique. Février-avril 1965 (in French), Paris: Publibook Editions, ISBN 978-2-7483-6746-1

== Legacy ==
- Camau, Michel; Geisser, Vincent (2004), Habib Bourguiba. La trace et l'héritage (in French), Paris: Karthala Editions, ISBN 978-2-84586-506-8
- Krichene, Aziz (2003), Syndrome Bourguiba (in French), Tunis: Cérès Editions, ISBN 978-9973-700-77-3
- Lajili, Chaker (2008), Bourguiba-Senghor, Deux géants de l'Afrique (in French), Paris: L'Harmattan Editions, ISBN 978-2-296-06781-3
- Mansar, Adnène (2004), L'État de Bourguiba (in Arabic), Tunis: Amal Editions
- Salem, Norma (1984), Habib Bourguiba, Islam, and the creation of Tunisia, London: Croom Helm Editions, ISBN 978-0-7099-3319-9
- Zaghouani-Dhaouadi, Henda (2006), La francophonie de Habib Bourguiba : essais d'analyse de discours (1960–1970) (in French), Paris: Atelier national de reproduction des thèses

== Public image ==
- Sassi, Néjib (2013), Bourguiba aux regards de ses partisans et de ses opposants (in French), Tunis: Arabesques Editions
