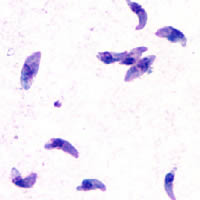
- Giemsa stained T. gondii tachyzoites, 1000× magnification

Scientific classification
- Domain: Eukaryota
- Supergroup: Alveolata
- Phylum: Apicomplexa
- Class: Conoidasida
- Order: Eucoccidiorida
- Family: Sarcocystidae
- Subfamily: Toxoplasmatinae
- Genus: Toxoplasma; Nicolle & Manceaux, 1909
- Species: T. gondii

Binomial name
- Toxoplasma gondii (Nicolle & Manceaux, 1908)

= Toxoplasma gondii =

Species of protozoan parasite

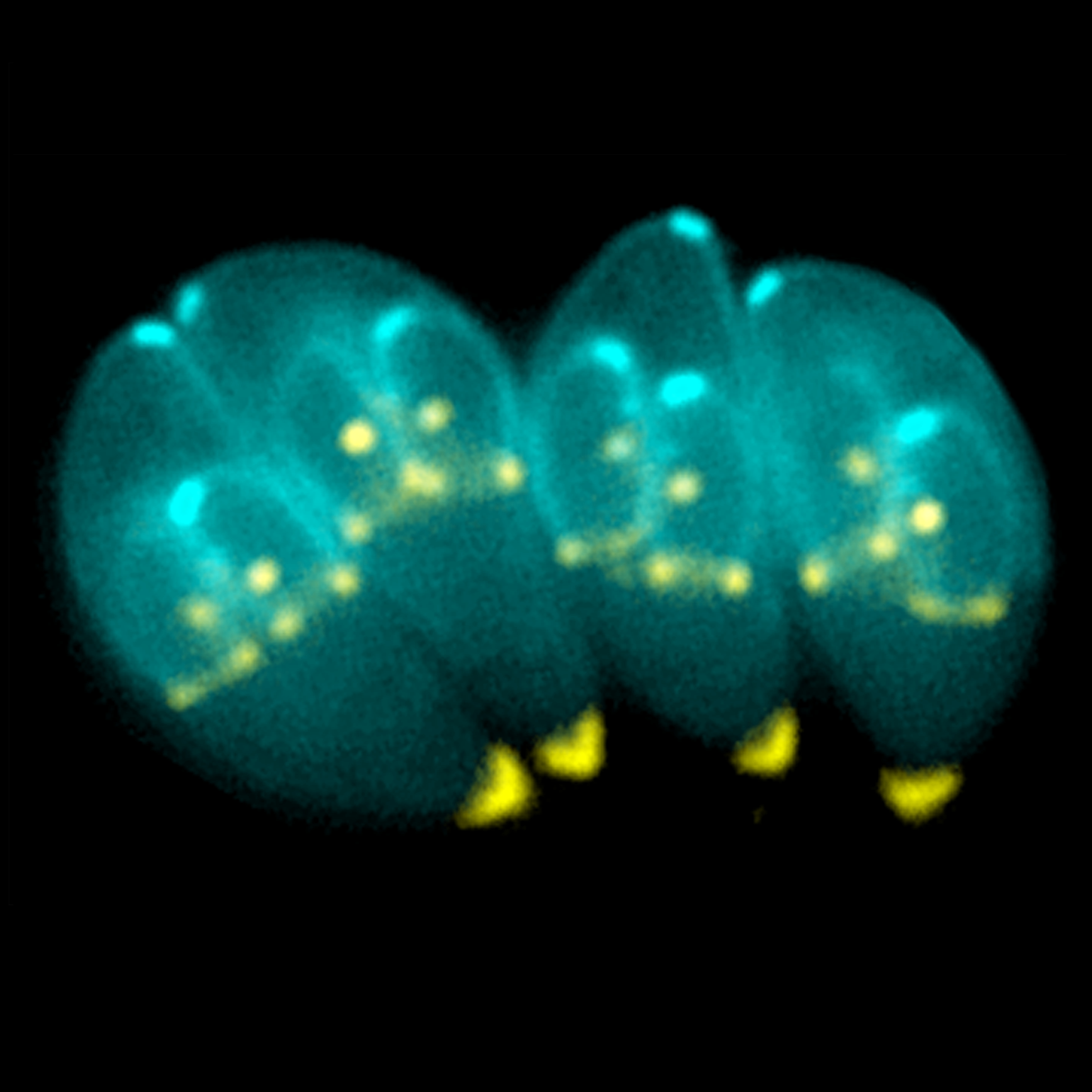
Dividing T. gondii parasites

Toxoplasma gondii (/ˈtɒksəˌplæzmə ˈɡɒndi.aɪ, -iː/) is a species of parasitic alveolate that causes toxoplasmosis. Found worldwide, T. gondii is capable of infecting virtually all warm-blooded animals, but members of the cat family (Felidae) are the only known definitive hosts in which the parasite may undergo sexual reproduction.

In rodents, T. gondii alters behavior in ways that increase the rodents' chances of being preyed upon by felids. Support for this "manipulation hypothesis" stems from studies showing that T. gondii-infected rats have a decreased aversion to cat urine while infection in mice lowers general anxiety, increases explorative behaviors and increases a loss of aversion to predators in general. Because cats are one of the only hosts within which T. gondii can sexually reproduce, such behavioral manipulations are thought to be evolutionary adaptations that increase the parasite's reproductive success since rodents that do not avoid cat habitations will more likely become cat prey. The primary mechanisms of T. gondii–induced behavioral changes in rodents occur through epigenetic remodeling in neurons that govern the relevant behaviors.

In humans infection is generally asymptomatic, but particularly in infants and those with weakened immunity, T. gondii may lead to a serious case of toxoplasmosis. T. gondii can initially cause mild, flu-like symptoms in the first few weeks following exposure, but otherwise, healthy human adults are asymptomatic. This asymptomatic state of infection is referred to as a latent infection, and it has been associated with numerous subtle behavioral, psychiatric, and personality alterations in humans. Behavioral changes observed between infected and non-infected humans include a decreased aversion to cat urine (but with divergent trajectories by gender) and an increased risk of schizophrenia and suicidal ideation. Preliminary evidence has suggested that T. gondii infection may induce some of the same alterations in the human brain as those observed in rodents. Many of these associations have been debated and one study conducted in 2016 has found them to be weak.

T. gondii is one of the most common parasites in developed countries; serological studies estimate that up to 50% of the global population has been exposed to, and may be chronically infected with, T. gondii; although infection rates differ significantly from country to country. Estimates have shown the highest IgG seroprevalence to be in Ethiopia, at 64.2%, as of 2018.

== Structure ==
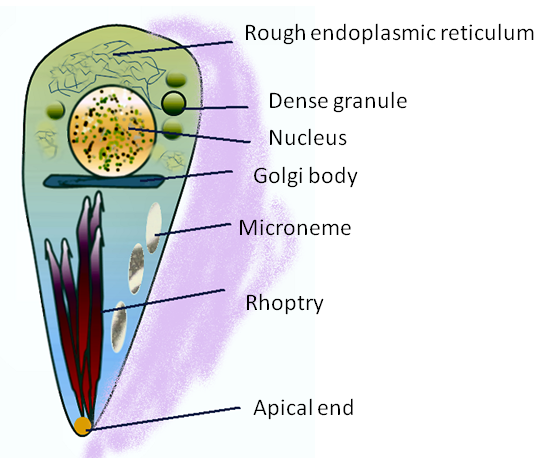
Diagram of T. gondii structure

T. gondii contains organelles called rhoptries and micronemes. They contain proteins for invasion and effectors for manipulating the hosts immune response. To inject them into host cells, T. gondii uses the apical complex located in the tip of the cell to puncture the host membrane and discharge the contents of these organelles. The two microtubulins and their associated proteins inside the conoid of the apical complex facilitate this by organizing and docking the rhoptries to the complex. The mechanism underlying this is yet to be discovered fully but the roles of the microtubulins and the four associated proteins have been identified.

== Life cycle ==
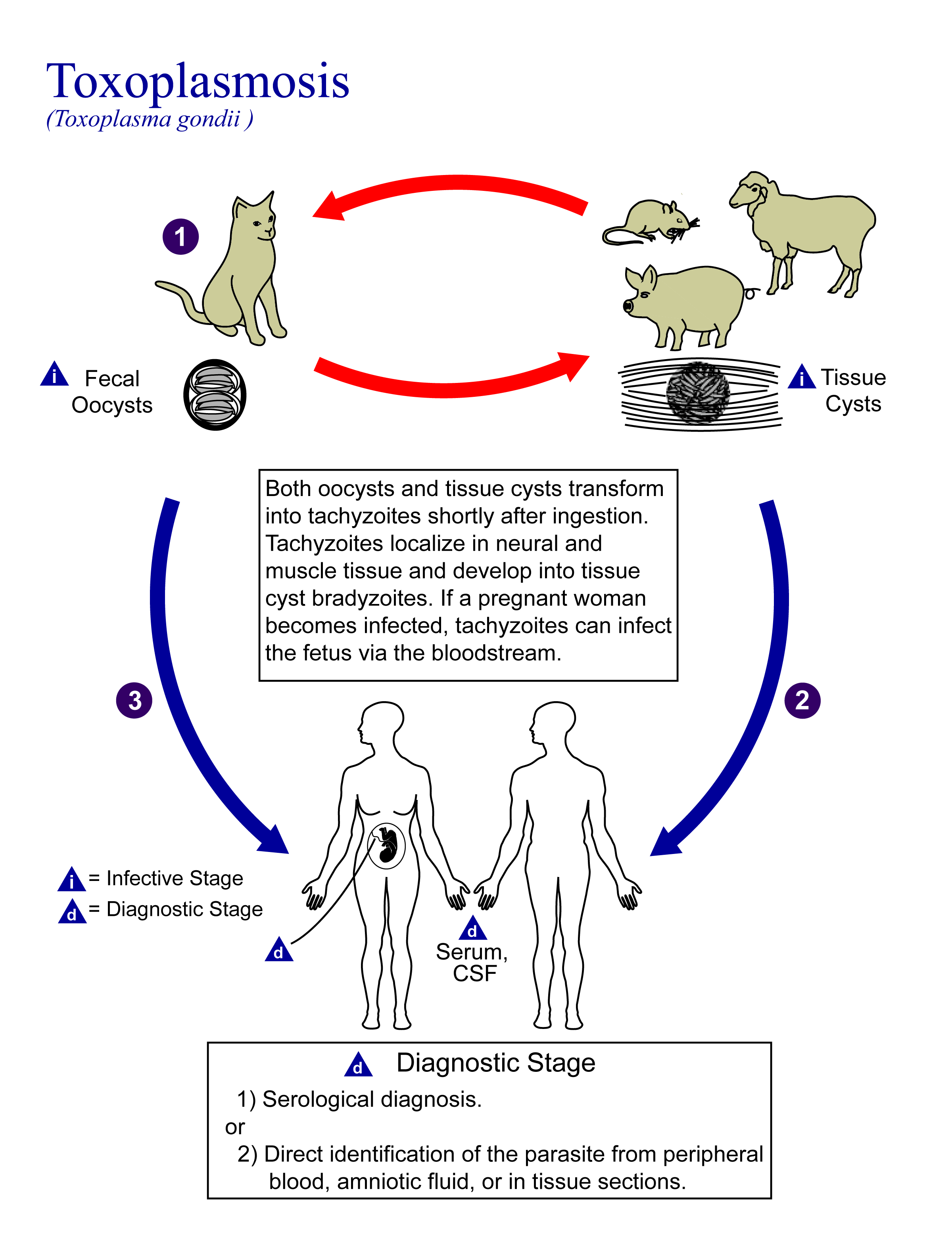
Life cycle of Toxoplasma gondii

More detailed diagram. The feces of infected cats infects rodents hunted by cats, which rodents are more likely to be eaten by cats; it also infects animals bred for meat, which is a vector depending on how the meat is treated.

The life cycle of T. gondii may be broadly summarized into two components: a sexual component that occurs only within cats (felids, wild or domestic), and an asexual component that can occur within virtually all warm-blooded animals, including humans, cats, and birds. Because T. gondii can sexually reproduce only within cats, cats are therefore the definitive host of T. gondii. All other hosts – in which only asexual reproduction can occur – are intermediate hosts.

=== Sexual reproduction in the feline definitive host ===
When a feline is infected with T. gondii (e.g. by consuming an infected mouse carrying the parasite's tissue cysts), the parasite survives passage through the stomach, eventually infecting epithelial cells of the cat's small intestine. Inside these intestinal cells, the parasites undergo sexual development and reproduction, producing millions of thick-walled, zygote-containing cysts known as oocysts. Felines are the only definitive host because they lack expression of the enzyme delta-6-desaturase (D6D) in their intestine. This enzyme converts linoleic acid; the absence of expression allows systemic linoleic acid accumulation. Recent findings showed that this excess of linoleic acid is essential for T. gondii sexual reproduction.

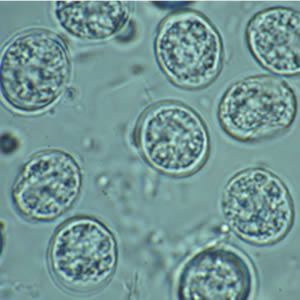
T. gondii oocysts in a fecal flotation

=== Feline shedding of oocysts ===
Infected epithelial cells eventually rupture and release oocysts into the intestinal lumen, whereupon they are shed in the cat's feces. Oocysts can then spread to soil, water, food, or anything potentially contaminated with the feces. Highly resilient, oocysts can survive and remain infective for many months in cold and dry climates.

Ingestion of oocysts by humans or other warm-blooded animals is one of the common routes of infection. Humans can be exposed to oocysts by, for example, consuming unwashed vegetables or contaminated water, or by handling the feces (litter) of an infected cat. Although cats can also be infected by ingesting oocysts, they are much less sensitive to oocyst infection than are intermediate hosts.

=== Initial infection of the intermediate host ===
Intermediate hosts found include pigs, chickens, goats, sheep and Macropus rufus by Moré et al. 2010. Cattle and horses are resistant and thought to be incapable of significant infection. T. gondii is considered to have three stages of infection; the tachyzoite stage of rapid division, the bradyzoite stage of slow division within tissue cysts, and the oocyst environmental stage. Tachyzoites are also known as "tachyzoic merozoites" and bradyzoites as "bradyzoic merozoites". When an oocyst or tissue cyst is ingested by a human or other warm-blooded animal, the resilient cyst wall is dissolved by proteolytic enzymes in the stomach and small intestine, freeing sporozoites from within the oocyst. The parasites first invade cells in and surrounding the intestinal epithelium, and inside these cells, the parasites differentiate into tachyzoites, the motile and quickly multiplying cellular stage of T. gondii. Tissue cysts in tissues such as brain and muscle tissue, form about 7–10 days after initial infection. Although severe infection of M. rufus has been observed it is unknown whether this is common.

=== Asexual reproduction in the intermediate host ===
Inside host cells, the tachyzoites replicate inside specialized vacuoles (called the parasitophorous vacuoles) created from host cell membrane during invasion into the cell. Tachyzoites multiply inside this vacuole until the host cell dies and ruptures, releasing and spreading the tachyzoites via the bloodstream to all organs and tissues of the body, including the brain.

=== Growth in tissue culture ===
The parasite can be easily grown in monolayers of mammalian cells maintained in vitro in tissue culture. It readily invades and multiplies in a wide variety of fibroblast and monocyte cell lines. In infected cultures, the parasite rapidly multiplies and hundreds of tachyzoites break out of infected cells and enter adjacent cells, destroying the monolayer in due course. New monolayers can then be infected using a drop of this infected culture fluid and the parasite indefinitely maintained without the need of animals.

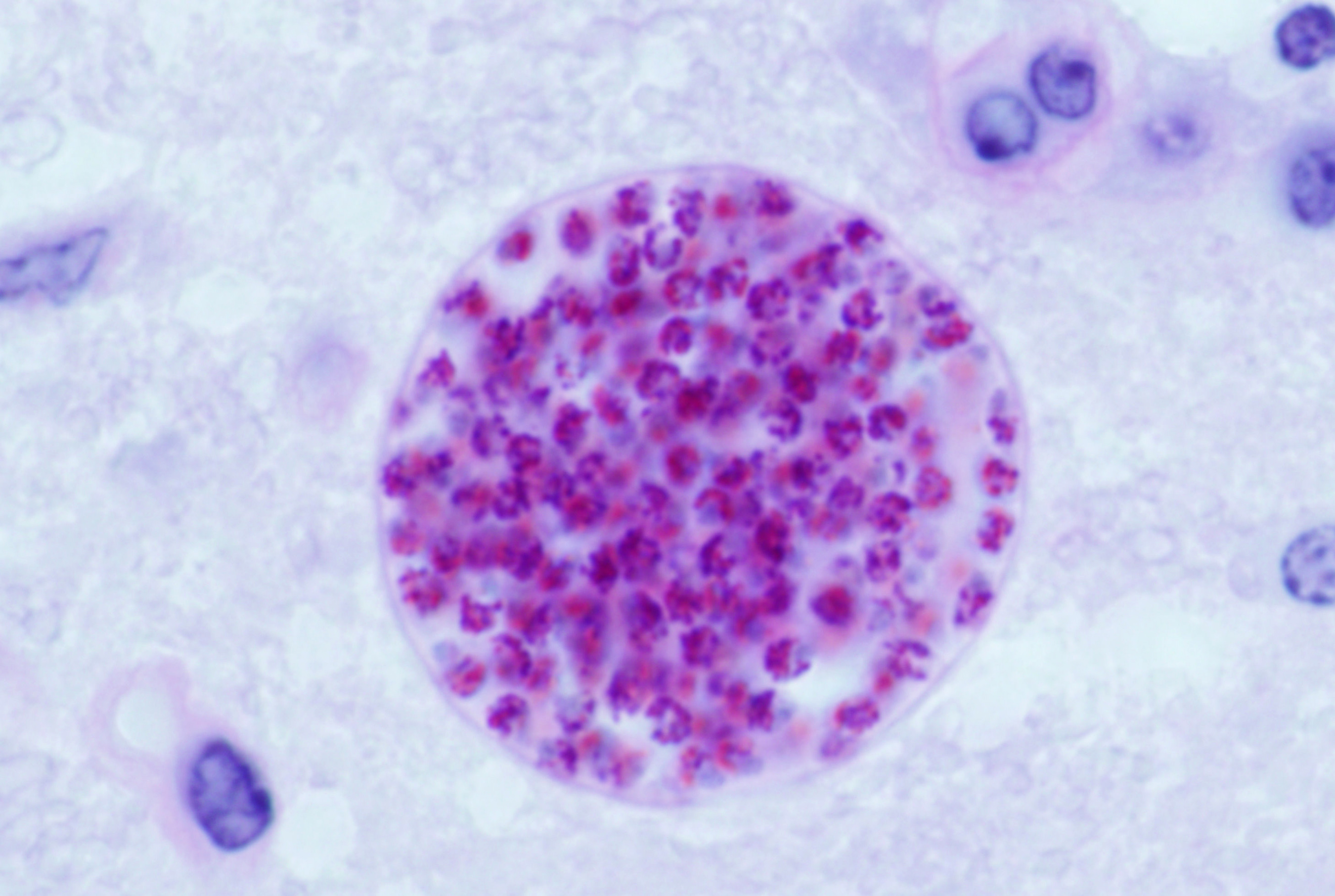
T. gondii tissue cyst in a mouse brain. Individual bradyzoites can be seen within.

=== Formation of tissue cysts ===
Following the initial period of infection characterized by tachyzoite proliferation throughout the body, pressure from the host's immune system causes T. gondii tachyzoites to convert into bradyzoites, the semi-dormant, slowly dividing cellular stage of the parasite. Inside host cells, clusters of these bradyzoites are known as tissue cysts. The cyst wall is formed by the parasitophorous vacuole membrane. Although bradyzoite-containing tissue cysts can form in virtually any organ, tissue cysts predominantly form and persist in the brain, the eyes, and striated muscle (including the heart). However, specific tissue tropisms can vary between intermediate host species; in pigs, the majority of tissue cysts are found in muscle tissue, whereas in mice, the majority of cysts are found in the brain.

Cysts usually range in size between five and 50 μm in diameter, (with 50 μm being about two-thirds the width of the average human hair).

Consumption of tissue cysts in meat is one of the primary means of T. gondii infection, both for humans and for meat-eating, warm-blooded animals. Humans consume tissue cysts when eating raw or undercooked meat (particularly pork and lamb). Tissue cyst consumption is also the primary means by which cats are infected.

An exhibit at the San Diego Natural History Museum states urban runoff with cat feces transports Toxoplasma gondii into the ocean, where it can kill sea otters.

=== Chronic infection ===
Tissue cysts can be maintained in host tissue for the lifetime of the animal. However, the perpetual presence of cysts appears to be due to a periodic process of cyst rupturing and re-encysting, rather than a perpetual lifespan of individual cysts or bradyzoites. At any given time in a chronically infected host, a very small percentage of cysts are rupturing, although the exact cause of this tissue cyst rupture is, as of 2010, not yet known.

Theoretically, T. gondii can be passed between intermediate hosts indefinitely via a cycle of consumption of tissue cysts in meat. However, the parasite's life cycle begins and completes only when the parasite is passed to a feline host, the only host within which the parasite can again undergo sexual development and reproduction.

=== Population structure in the wild ===
In 2006, researchers reviewed evidence that T. gondii has an unusual population structure dominated by three clonal lineages called Types I, II and III that occur in North America and Europe, despite the occurrence of a sexual phase in its life cycle. They estimated that a common ancestor existed about 10,000 years ago. Authors of a subsequent and larger study on 196 isolates from diverse sources including T. gondii in the bald eagle, gray wolf, Arctic fox and sea otter, also found that T. gondii strains infecting North American wildlife have limited genetic diversity with the occurrence of only a few major clonal types. They found that 85% of strains in North America were of one of three widespread genotypes II, III and Type 12. Thus T. gondii has retained the capability for sex in North America over many generations, producing largely clonal populations, and matings have generated little genetic diversity.

== Cellular stages ==
During different periods of its life cycle, individual parasites convert into various cellular stages, with each stage characterized by a distinct cellular morphology, biochemistry, and behavior. These stages include the tachyzoites, merozoites, bradyzoites (found in tissue cysts), and sporozoites (found in oocysts).

Some stages are motile and some calcium-dependent protein kinases (TgCDPKs) are involved in this parasite's motility. Gaji et al. 2015 find TgCDPK3 is required to begin the action of motility because it phosphorylates T. gondii's myosin A (TgMYOA). TgCDPK3 is the functional orthologue of CDPK1 in this parasite.

=== Tachyzoites ===
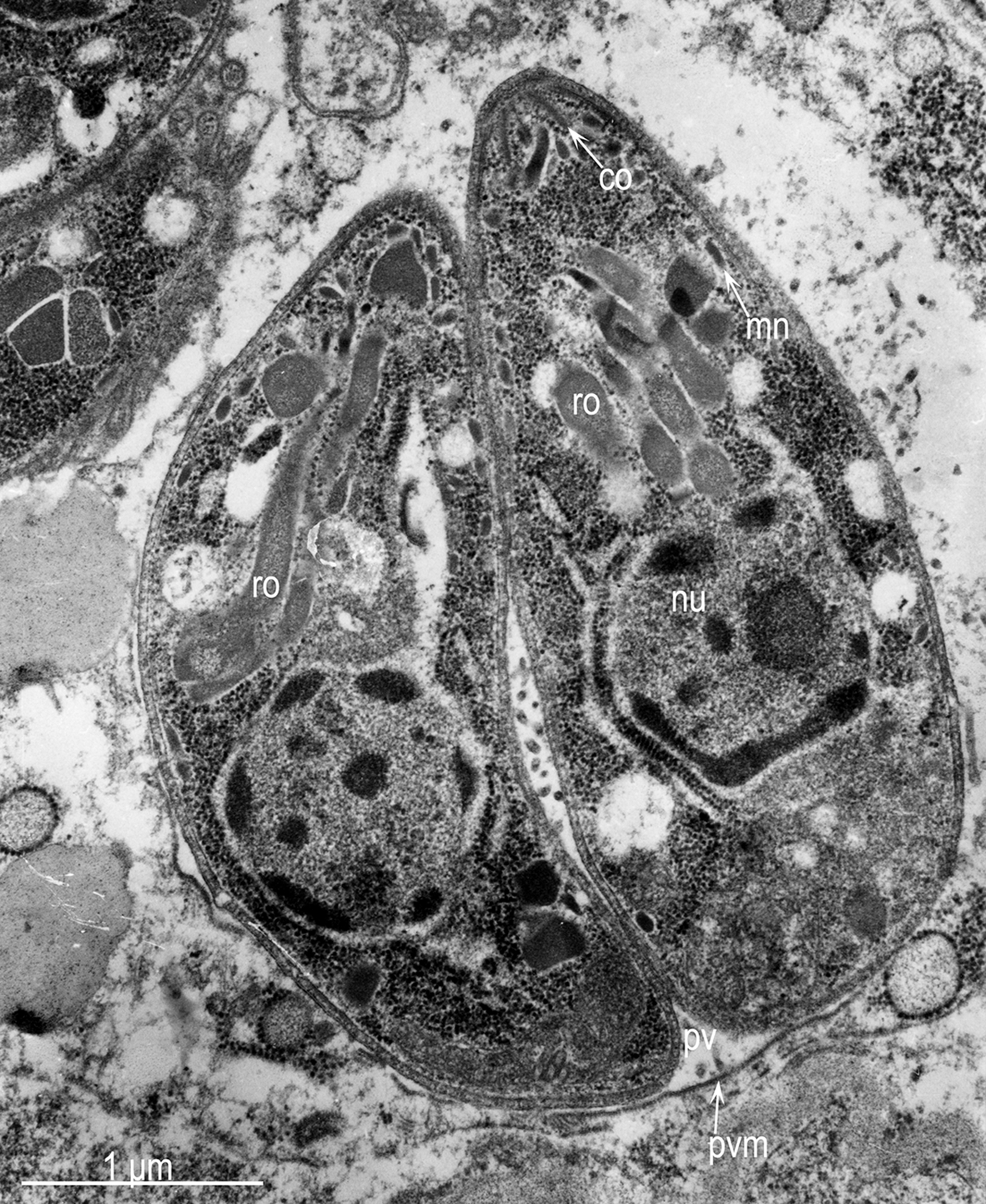
Two tachyzoites, transmission electron microscopy

Motile, and quickly multiplying, tachyzoites are responsible for expanding the population of the parasite in the host. When a host consumes a tissue cyst (containing bradyzoites) or an oocyst (containing sporozoites), the bradyzoites or sporozoites stage-convert into tachyzoites upon infecting the intestinal epithelium of the host. During the initial acute period of infection, tachyzoites spread throughout the body via the blood stream. During the later, latent (chronic) stages of infection, tachyzoites stage-convert to bradyzoites to form tissue cysts. To survive in the host, tachyzoites manipulate the immune response by injecting the contents of rhoptries into host cells. This seems to be vital for their survival, as knock-out strains of T. gondii which are unable to inject hosts with rhoptries have been shown to be avirulent in vivo.

=== Merozoites ===
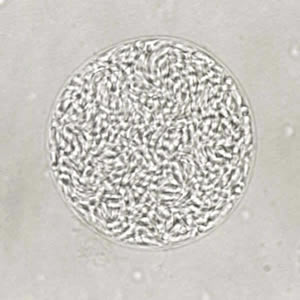
An unstained T. gondii tissue cyst. Bradyzoites can be seen within.

Like tachyzoites, merozoites divide quickly and are responsible for expanding the population of the parasite inside the cat's intestine before sexual reproduction. When a feline definitive host consumes a tissue cyst (containing bradyzoites), bradyzoites convert into merozoites inside intestinal epithelial cells. Following a brief period of rapid population growth in the intestinal epithelium, merozoites convert into the noninfectious sexual stages of the parasite to undergo sexual reproduction, eventually resulting in zygote-containing oocysts.

Studying the sexual phases of the T. gondii life cycle remains challenging and determining the precise triggers and molecular mechanisms governing this developmental program remains an ongoing area of research. Major challenges associated with the ability to cultivate presexual and sexual stages of T. gondii in vitro have limited our understanding of this developmental program and how it is triggered by the parasite in response to the infection of the cat. Multiple studies revealed distinct differences in the transcriptomes of the asexual and sexual stages of T. gondii. Additionally, metabolic disparities within the feline host have been identified as key factors influencing the transition to sexual stages. However, linking gene expression patterns to stage transitions and deciphering the genetic triggers driving the switch from asexual to sexual development remain unresolved.

Important recent advancements in the field have shed new light on the regulatory mechanisms governing sexual development in T. gondii. Farhat and colleagues showed that chromatin modifiers MORC and HDAC3 play critical roles in silencing sexual development-specific genes. In MORC-depleted parasites, a broad activation of sexual gene expression was observed. In a later study, it was suggested that MORC-depleted parasites have disrupted sub-telomeric gene silencing. The disorganization in telomeres may have led to the misregulation of sexual development.

Moreover, the discovery of specific transcription factors essential for sexual commitment has provided invaluable insights into the intricate regulatory network orchestrating stage specificity in T. gondii. Multiple parasite transcription factors have been identified as critical suppressors of presexual development, permitting the study of presexual stages and opening new avenues for using genetics to drive the full sexual cycle in vitro. Specifically, the depletion of AP2XI-2 and AP2XII-1 in T. gondii induces merozoite-specific gene expression, raising the possibility for cultivating T. gondii sexual development in laboratory settings.

Crucial questions still persist regarding the genetic determinants that dictate whether parasites develop into macrogametes or microgametes. The development of new molecular and genomic approaches, such as single-cell transcriptomics and proteomics, should be useful to those in the field working towards unraveling the molecular intricacies of this process.

=== Bradyzoites ===
Bradyzoites are the slowly dividing stage of the parasite that make up tissue cysts. When an uninfected host consumes a tissue cyst, bradyzoites released from the cyst infect intestinal epithelial cells before converting to the proliferative tachyzoite stage. Following the initial period of proliferation throughout the host body, tachyzoites then convert back to bradyzoites, which reproduce inside host cells to form tissue cysts in the new host.

=== Sporozoites ===
Sporozoites are the stage of the parasite residing within oocysts. When a human or other warm-blooded host consumes an oocyst, sporozoites are released from it, infecting epithelial cells before converting to the proliferative tachyzoite stage.

== Immune response ==
Initially, a T. gondii infection stimulates production of IL-2 and IFN-γ by the innate immune system. Continuous IFN-γ production is necessary for control of both acute and chronic T. gondii infection. These two cytokines elicit a CD4+ and CD8+ T-cell mediated immune response. Thus, T-cells play a central role in immunity against Toxoplasma infection. T-cells recognize Toxoplasma antigens that are presented to them by the body's own Major Histocompatibility Complex (MHC) molecules. The specific genetic sequence of a given MHC molecule differs dramatically between individuals, which is why these molecules are involved in transplant rejection. Individuals carrying certain genetic sequences of MHC molecules are much more likely to be infected with Toxoplasma. One study of >1600 individuals found that Toxoplasma infection was especially common among people who expressed certain MHC alleles (HLA-B*08:01, HLA-C*04:01, HLA-DRB 03:01, HLA-DQA*05:01 and HLA-DQB*02:01).

IL-12 is produced during T. gondii infection to activate natural killer (NK) cells. Tryptophan is an essential amino acid for T. gondii, which it scavenges from host cells. IFN-γ induces the activation of indole-amine-2,3-dioxygenase (IDO) and tryptophan-2,3-dioxygenase (TDO), two enzymes that are responsible for the degradation of tryptophan. Immune pressure eventually leads the parasite to form cysts that normally are deposited in the muscles and in the brain of the hosts.

=== Immune response and behavior alterations ===
The IFN-γ-mediated activation of IDO and TDO is an evolutionary mechanism that serves to starve the parasite, but it can result in depletion of tryptophan in the brain of the host. IDO and TDO degrade tryptophan to N-formylkynurenine. Administration of L-kynurenine is capable of inducing depressive-like behavior in mice. T. gondii infection has been demonstrated to increase the levels of kynurenic acid (KYNA) in the brains of infected mice and in the brain of schizophrenic persons. Low levels of tryptophan and serotonin in the brain were already associated with depression.

== Risk factors for human infection ==
The following have been identified as being risk factors for T. gondii infection in humans and warm-blooded animals:

- by consuming raw or undercooked meat containing T. gondii tissue cysts. The most common threat to citizens in the United States is from eating raw or undercooked pork.
- by ingesting water, soil, vegetables, or anything contaminated with oocysts shed in the feces of an infected animal. Cat fecal matter is particularly dangerous: Just one cyst consumed by a cat can result in thousands of oocysts. This is why physicians recommend pregnant or ill persons do not clean the cat's litter box at home. These oocysts are resilient to harsh environmental conditions and can survive over a year in contaminated soil.
- from a blood transfusion or organ transplant
- from transplacental transmission from mother to fetus, particularly when T. gondii is contracted during pregnancy
- from drinking unpasteurized goat milk
- from raw and treated sewage and bivalve shellfish contaminated by treated sewage

A common argument in the debate about whether cat ownership is ethical involves the question of T. gondii transmission to humans. Even though "living in a household with a cat that used a litter box was strongly associated with infection," and living with several kittens or any cat under one year of age has some significance, several other studies claim to have shown that living in a household with a cat is not a significant risk factor for T. gondii infection.

Specific vectors for transmission may also differ based on geographic location. "The seawater in California is thought to be contaminated by T. gondii oocysts that originate from cat feces, survive or bypass sewage treatment, and travel to the coast through river systems. T. gondii has been identified in a California mussel by polymerase chain reaction and DNA sequencing. In light of the potential presence of T. gondii, pregnant women and immunosuppressed persons should be aware of this potential risk associated with eating raw oysters, mussels, and clams."

In warm-blooded animals, such as brown rats, sheep, and dogs, T. gondii has also been shown to be sexually transmitted.

== Preventing infection ==
The following precautions are recommended to prevent or greatly reduce the chances of becoming infected with T. gondii. This information has been adapted from the websites of United States Centers for Disease Control and Prevention and the Mayo Clinic.

=== From food ===
Basic food-handling safety practices can prevent or reduce the chances of becoming infected with T. gondii, such as washing unwashed fruits and vegetables, and avoiding raw or undercooked meat, poultry, and seafood. Other unsafe practices such as drinking unpasteurized milk or untreated water can increase odds of infection. As T. gondii is commonly transmitted through ingesting microscopic cysts in the tissues of infected animals, meat that is not prepared to destroy these presents a risk of infection. Freezing meat for several days at subzero temperatures (0 °F or −18 °C) before cooking may break down all cysts, as they rarely survive these temperatures. During cooking, whole cuts of red meat should be cooked to an internal temperature of at least 145 °F (63 °C). Medium rare meat is generally cooked between 130 and 140 °F (54 and 60 °C), so cooking meat to at least medium is recommended. After cooking, a rest period of 3 min should be allowed before consumption. However, ground meat should be cooked to an internal temperature of at least 160 °F (71 °C) with no rest period. All poultry should be cooked to an internal temperature of at least 165 °F (74 °C). After cooking, a rest period of 3 min should be allowed before consumption.

=== From environment ===
Oocysts in cat feces take at least a day to sporulate (to become infectious after they are shed), so disposing of cat litter daily greatly reduces the chance of infectious oocysts developing. As these can spread and survive in the environment for months, humans should wear gloves when gardening or working with soil, and should wash their hands promptly after disposing of cat litter. These precautions apply to outdoor sandboxes/play sand pits, which should be covered when not in use. Cat feces should never be flushed down a toilet.

Pregnant women are at higher risk of transmitting the parasite to their unborn child and immunocompromised people of acquiring a lingering infection. Because of this, they should not change or handle cat litter boxes. Ideally, cats should be kept indoors and fed only food that has low to no risk of carrying oocysts, such as commercial cat food or well-cooked table food.

=== Vaccination ===
No approved human vaccine exists against Toxoplasma gondii. Research on human vaccines is ongoing.

For sheep, an approved live vaccine sold as Toxovax (from MSD Animal Health) provides lifetime protection.

There is currently no commercially available vaccine to prevent T. gondii infection in cats. However, research into feline vaccines for toxoplasmosis is ongoing, with several candidates showing positive results in clinical trials.

== Treatment ==
In humans, active toxoplasmosis can be treated with a combination of drugs such as pyrimethamine and sulfadiazine, plus folinic acid. Immune-compromised patients may need continuous treatment until/unless their immune system is restored. There is no known human treatment for chronic infections.

The most significant limitation of current clinical treatments is their inability to eliminate the dormant bradyzoite tissue cysts established during chronic infection. These cysts persist in the brain and muscle tissues, making the infection lifelong and prone to reactivation in immunocompromised hosts, such as those with HIV/AIDS or undergoing immunosuppressive therapy.

While not approved for these uses, studies have shown that certain antipsychotic or anticonvulsant medications may inhibit T. gondii tachyzoites in in vitro cultures of human brain tissue. Examples include fluphenazine, valproic acid, haloperidol, and zuclopenthixol. It is unclear if tissue cysts are killed by these agents.

Some experimental and established antiparasitic medication is known to kill tissue cysts in in-vitro mice cells, with an example of an established drug being azithromycin.

There is no evidence that the administration of antiparasitics, including azithromycin, helps those diagnosed with schizophrenia (see Behavioral differences of infected hosts).

== Environmental effects ==
In many parts of the world, where there are high populations of feral cats, there is an increased risk to the native wildlife due to increased infection of Toxoplasma gondii. It has been found that the serum concentrations of T. gondii in the wildlife population were increased where there are high amounts of cat populations. This creates a dangerous environment for organisms that have not evolved in cohabitation with felines and their contributing parasites.

== Water transmission ==
The transmission of oocysts has been unknown, even though there have many documented cases of infection in marine species. Researchers have found that the oocytes of T. gondii can survive in seawater for at least six months, with the amount of salt concentration not affecting its life cycle. There have been no studies on the ability of T. gondii oocysts' life cycle within freshwater environments, although infections are still present. One possible hypothesis of transmission is via amoeba species, particularly Acanthamoeba spp., certain species of which can be found in all water environments (fresh, brackish, and full-strength seawater). Normally, amoebas function as a natural filter, phagocytizing nutrients and bacteria found within the water. Some pathogens have used this to their advantage, however, and evolved to be able to avoid being broken down and, thus, survive encased in the amoeba – this includes Holosporaceae, Pseudomonaceae, Burkholderiaceae, among others. Overall, this aids the pathogen in transportation but, also, protection from drugs and sterilizers that would, otherwise, cause death in the pathogen. Studies have shown that T. gondii oocysts can live within amoebas after being engulfed for at least 14 days without significant obliteration of the parasite. The ability of the microorganism to survive in vitro is dependent on the microorganism itself, but there are a few overarching mechanisms present. T. gondii oocysts have been found to resist an acidic pH and, thus, are protected by the acidification found in endocytic vacuoles and lysosomes. Phagocytosis further increases with the carbohydrate-rich surface membrane located on the amoebae. The pathogen can be released either by lysis of the amoebae or by exocytosis, but this is understudied

== Current environmental efforts ==
Urbanization and global warming are extremely influential in the transmission of T. gondii. Temperature and humidity are huge factors in the sporulation stage: low humidity is always fatal to the oocysts, and they are also vulnerable to extreme temperatures. Rainfall is also an important factor for survival of waterborne pathogens. Because increased rainfall directly increases the flow rate in rivers, the amount of flow into coastal areas is increased as well. This can spread waterborne pathogens over wide areas.

There is no effective vaccine for T. gondii, and research on a live vaccine is ongoing. Feeding cats commercially available food, rather than raw, undercooked meat, prevents felines from becoming a host for oocysts, as higher prevalence is in areas where raw meat is fed. Researchers also suggest that owners restrict cats to live indoors and to be neutered or spayed to decrease stray cat populations and to reduce intermediate host interactions. It is suggested that fecal matter from litter boxes be collected daily, placed in a sealable bag, and disposed of in the trash rather than flushed in the toilet, so that water contamination is limited.

Studies have found that wetlands with a high density of vegetation decrease the concentration of oocysts in water through two possible mechanisms. Firstly, vegetation decreases flow velocities, which enables more settling because of increased transport time. Secondly, the vegetation can remove oocysts through its ability to mechanically strain the water, as well as through the process of adhesion (i.e. attachment to biofilms). Areas of erosion and destruction of coastal wetlands have been found to harbour increased concentrations of T. gondii oocysts, which then flow into open coastal waters. Current physical and chemical treatments typically utilized in water treatment facilities have been proven to be ineffective against T. gondii. Research has shown that UV-C disinfection of water containing oocysts results in inactivation and possible sterilization.

== Genome ==
The genomes of more than 60 strains of T. gondii have been sequenced. Most are 60–80 Mb in size and consist of 11–14 chromosomes. The major strains encode 7,800–10,000 proteins, of which about 5,200 are conserved across RH, GT1, ME49, VEG. A database, ToxoDB, has been established to document genomic information on Toxoplasma.

== History ==
In 1908, while working at the Pasteur Institute in Tunis, Charles Nicolle and Louis Manceaux discovered a protozoan organism in the tissues of a hamster-like rodent known as the gundi, Ctenodactylus gundi. Although Nicolle and Manceaux initially believed the organism to be a member of the genus Leishmania that they described as "Leishmania gondii", they soon realized they had discovered a new organism entirely; they renamed it Toxoplasma gondii. The new genus name Toxoplasma is a reference to its morphology: Toxo, from Greek τόξον (toxon, 'arc, bow'), and πλάσμα (plasma, 'shape, form') and the host in which it was discovered, the gundi (gondii). The same year Nicolle and Mancaeux discovered T. gondii, Alfonso Splendore identified the same organism in a rabbit in Brazil. However, he did not give it a name. In 1914, Italian tropicalist Aldo Castellani "was first to suspect that toxoplasmosis could affect humans".

The first conclusive identification of T. gondii in humans was in an infant girl delivered full term by Caesarean section on May 23, 1938, at Babies' Hospital in New York City. The girl began having seizures at three days of age, and doctors identified lesions in the maculae of both of her eyes. When she died at one month of age, an autopsy was performed. Lesions discovered in her brain and eye tissue were found to have both free and intracellular T. gondii. Infected tissue from the girl was homogenized and inoculated intracerebrally into rabbits and mice; they then developed encephalitis. Later, congenital transmission was confirmed in many other species, particularly infected sheep and rodents.

The possibility of T. gondii transmission via consumption of undercooked meat was first proposed by D. Weinman and A.H. Chandler in 1954. In 1960, the relevant cyst wall were shown to dissolve in the proteolytic enzymes found in the stomach, releasing infectious bradyzoites into the stomach (which pass into the intestine). The hypothesis of transmission via consumption of undercooked meat was tested on children hospitalized in a sanatorium in Paris in 1965 by Georges Desmonts et al.; incidence of T. gondii rose from 10% to 50% after a year of adding two portions of cooked-rare beef or horse meat to many children's daily diets, and to 100% among those fed cooked-rare lamb chops.

A 1959 Mumbai-based study found their prevalence in strict vegetarians was similar to that of non-vegetarians. This raised the possibility of a third major route of infection, beyond congenital and non well-cooked meat carnivorous transmission.

In 1970, oocysts were found in (cat) feces. The fecal–oral route of infection via oocysts was demonstrated. In the 1970s and 1980s feces of a vast range of infected animal species was tested to see if it contained oocysts—at least 17 species of felids shed oocysts, but no non-felid has been shown to allow T. gondii sexual reproduction (leading to oocyst shedding).

In 1984 Elmer R. Pfefferkorn published his discovery that treatment of human fibroblasts with human recombinant interferon gamma blocks the growth of T. gondii.

== Behavioral differences of infected hosts ==
There are many instances where behavioural changes were reported in rodents with T. gondii. The changes seen were a reduction in their innate dislike of cats, which made it easier for cats to prey on the rodents. In an experiment conducted by Berdoy and colleagues, the infected rats showed preference for the cat odour area versus the area with the rabbit scent, therefore making it easier for the parasite to take its final step in its definitive feline host. This is an example of the extended phenotype concept, that is, the idea that the behaviour of the infected animal changes in order to maximize survival of the genes that increase predation of the intermediate rodent host.

- Differences in sex-dependent behavior observed in infected hosts compared to non-infected individuals can be attributed to differences in testosterone. Infected males had higher levels of testosterone while infected females had significantly lower levels, compared to their non-infected equivalents.
- Looking at humans, studies using the Cattell's 16 Personality Factor questionnaire found that infected men scored lower on Factor G (superego strength/rule consciousness) and higher on Factor L (vigilance) while the opposite pattern was observed for infected women. Such men were more likely to disregard rules and were more expedient, suspicious, and jealous. On the other hand, women were more warm-hearted, outgoing, conscientious, and moralistic.
- Published research has also indicated that T. gondii infection could potentially promote changes in a person's political beliefs and values. Those who are infected with the parasite tend to exhibit a higher degree of "us versus them" thinking.
- Mice infected with T. gondii have a worse motor performance than non-infected mice. Thus, a computerized simple reaction test was given to both infected and non-infected adults. It was found that the infected adults performed much more poorly and lost their concentration more quickly than the control group. But, the effect of the infection only explains less than 10% of the variability in performance (i.e., there could be other confounding factors).
- Correlation has also been observed between seroprevalence of T. gondii in humans and increased risk of traffic accidents. Infected subjects have a 2.65 times higher risk of getting into a traffic accident. A Turkish study confirmed this holds true among drivers.
- This parasite has been associated with many neurological disorders such as schizophrenia. In a meta-analysis of 23 studies that met inclusion criteria, the seroprevalence of antibodies to T. gondii in people with schizophrenia is significantly higher than in control populations (OR=2.73, P<0.000001). The prescription of anti protozoans such atovaquone/proguanil, effective against T. gondii, has been found to be associated with a reduced risk of subsequent schizophrenia.
- A 2009 summary of studies found that suicide attempters had far more indicative (IgG) antibodies than mental health inpatients without a suicide attempt. Infection was also shown to be associated with suicide in women over the age of 60. (P<0.005).
- Research on the linkage between T. gondii infection and entrepreneurial behavior showed that students who tested positive for T. gondii exposure were 1.4 times more likely to major in business and 1.7 times more likely to have an emphasis in "management and entrepreneurship". Among 197 participants of entrepreneurship events, T. gondii exposure was correlated with being 1.8 times more likely to have started their own business.
- Another population-representative study with 7440 people in the United States found that Toxoplasma infection was 2.4 fold more common in people who had a history of manic and depression symptoms (bipolar disorder Type 1) compared to the general population.

One study in 2016 did not observe any significant association between T. gondii seropositivity and schizophrenia. The team note that the null findings might be a false negative due to low statistical power because of small sample sizes and concluded that further studies should be performed.

The mechanism behind behavioral changes is partially attributed to increased dopamine metabolism, which can be neutralized by dopamine antagonist medications. T. gondii has two genes that code for a bifunctional phenylalanine and tyrosine hydroxylase, two important and rate-limiting steps of dopamine biosynthesis. One of the genes is constitutively expressed, while the other is only produced during cyst development. In addition to additional dopamine production, T. gondii infection also produces long-lasting epigenetic changes in animals that increase the expression of vasopressin, a probable cause of alterations that persist after the clearance of the infection.

In 2022, a study published in Communications Biology of a well-documented population of wolves studied throughout their lives, suggested that T. gondii also may have a significant effect on their behavior. It suggested that infection with this parasite emboldened infected wolves into behavior that determined leadership roles and influenced risk-taking behavior, perhaps even motivating establishment of new independent packs that they would establish and lead in behavior patterns differing from that of the packs into which they were born. The study determined that at times, an infected wolf would become the only breeding male in a pack, leading to a significant effect on another species by T. gondii.

== Potential medical use ==
In July 2024, a study published in Nature Microbiology showed that T. gondii can be engineered to deliver the MECP2 protein, a therapeutic target of Rett syndrome, to the brain of infected mice.

== See also ==
- Toxoplasma lactate dehydrogenase 1 regulatory UTR
