= Manceaux =

Manceaux may refer to:

- The male denizens of Le Mans, France
- The male denizens of the traditional province of Maine, France
- Brigitte Manceaux (1914–1963), French pianist
- Gaëtan Manceaux, competitor for France at the 2014 Mediterranean Athletics U23 Championships – Results
- Jules Manceaux, jeweler who made the sword in the Greek crown jewels
- Louis Manceaux (1865–1934), French medical doctor

== See also ==
- Manceau (disambiguation)
