= Women in Tunisia =

General statistics
- Maternal mortality (per 100,000): 56 (2010)
- Women in parliament: 31.3% (2015)
- Women over 25 with secondary education: 37.5% (2015)
- Women in labour force: 25.1% (2015)

Gender Inequality Index
- Value: 0.259 (2021)
- Rank: 61st out of 191

Global Gender Gap Index
- Value: 0.643 (2022)
- Rank: 120th out of 146

Since the December 2010 revolution in Tunisia and protests across the Middle East and North Africa (MENA) began, Tunisian women have played an unprecedented part in the protests. Habib Bourguiba began instituting secular freedoms for women in 1956, such as access to higher education, the right to file for divorce, and certain job opportunities. Women in Tunisia enjoy certain freedoms and rights that are denied to women in neighboring countries, although the social norms have shifted since 2011.

== Demographics ==
As of 2008, the U.S. Population Reference Bureau reported that Tunisia's population of women between the ages of 15 and 49 was 3,000,000. By 2015, there will be 3,100,000 women of the same age bracket in the country. The life expectancy for women, from birth, is 79 years (men in Tunisia have a life expectancy of 72 years).

Flag of the Tunisian Republic

== History ==
When Tunisia was still under French protectorate, the majority of Tunisian women were uneducated and performed the domestic duties required by husbands and fathers. However, with the onset of the country's independence movement, a voice for equality between men and women emerged. In fact, by the early 20th century, many urban families were educating their daughters. When Tunisia regained its independence in 1956, the republic's founder—Habib Bourguiba—discussed repeatedly the need to include all persons in Tunisian society.

In 1916, Juliette Smaja Zérah became Tunisia's first female lawyer after being admitted to the Tunis bar.

In 1956, The Code of Personal Status (Tunisia) was enacted—a document that has undergone heavy reform since its inception. This document has abolished polygamy and repudiation, enabled women to ask for divorce, enacted a minimum age for marriage and ordered the consent of both spouses before marriage. Moreover, women earned the right to vote in 1957 and in 1959, women were able to seek office. The Constitution of Tunisia promulgates "the principle of equality" which has been applied favorably for women within the judiciary system, enabling them to enter untraditional job sectors (for example medicine with Habiba Djilani the first female surgeon, the army and engineering) as well as open bank accounts and establish businesses. In 1959, women were able to access birth control. In 1965 a law was passed that allowed women to have abortions as part of a population control policy. Abortion on request was legalized in October 1973.

In 1993, feminists and women's organizations’ lobbying efforts resulted in certain modifications to the Code of Personal Status. The modifications stated that a wife was not obliged to obey her husband, but did require her to "share part of the financial burden of the family". Despite releasing women from obedience to their husbands, they were now required to equally contribute to managing family affairs. However, a vague clause within the Code requires women to "deal with their husbands in accordance with custom and tradition." This clause makes it difficult for women to assert their independence (and thus ability to contribute to her family's financial burden) because 'tradition' and 'custom' are often used to reinforce a woman's subservience. After the Association des femmes tunisiennes pour la recherche et le développement and the Association tunisienne des femmes démocrates (ATFD) presented a document in which they demanded the full implementation of the agreement, the Tunisian government ratified the agreement on September 20, 1985.

As for the reservations shown by Tunisia at the signing of the Convention on the Elimination of All Forms of Discrimination Against Women in 1979, they show that those in power have not yet decided to take the step of equality. The agreement was signed on July 24, 1980, but with reservations, like other Muslim countries, concerning a few paragraphs of sections 15, 16 and 29 on the grounds of their contradictions with the provisions of the Code of Personal Status and the Quran.

To mark the occasion of the 50th anniversary of the implementation of the Code of Personal Status (Tunisia), president Zine el-Abidine Ben Ali announced two Bills that were adopted by the Chamber of Deputies of Tunisia on May 8, 2007. The first reinforces the legal housing rights of mothers having custody of children, and the second establishes a minimum age for marriage, at 18 years, for both sexes despite the fact that the actual average age at marriage had already surpassed 25 years for women and 30 years for men.

In matters related to motherhood, Tunisia is often considered as a country open to change.

On the occasion of the announcement on March 8, 2008 that the government would adhere to an additional protocol of the Convention on the Elimination of All Forms of Discrimination Against Women, coinciding with the International Women's Day, the president of the ATFD, Khadija Cherif, described the process as "positive but insufficient" and said it would continue "to advocate for the lifting of reservations that emptied the Convention of its meaning".

Tunisia observes several national holidays dedicated to women: International Women's Day (March 8) and August 13, the anniversary date of the implementation of the Code of Personal Status (Tunisia), which has become a public holiday called National Women's Day.

Since September 2017, Tunisian Muslim women are allowed to marry non-Muslims, that would scrap the old decree which requires the husbands to convert to Islam in order to complete an inter-faith marriage.

=== A desire for modernisation or a political necessity? ===
In Tunisia, the pursuit of feminist politics is all the more necessary since it is the main support to the good image of the country in Europe. In effect, even though the Economic growth is not negligible, it does not stand out from other countries in North Africa such as Morocco; as well, the suppression of the free speech and the political opposition in Tunisia have long tarnished the country's reputation abroad. The status of women remains a domain in which Tunisia, while under Bourguiba as under Ben Ali, could vindicate its uniqueness.

Colette Juillard-Beaudan believes that Tunisian women,

left to choose a form of democracy, "they" prefer it to be secular.

And this type of propaganda bore fruit as the country enjoyed, during the reign of Bourguiba, a solid reputation of national and civil secular in a region that more often consists of military dictatorships or monarchies connected to religion, as the CSP was itself declared in an authoritarian manner, since it was not debated publicly or in the Tunisian Constituent Assembly.

On February 9, 1994, a Tunisian Women's Day was organized by the Senate of France under the slogan "Une modernité assumée, la Tunisie" (in English: Tunisia: Embracing Modernity). Shortly after a debate organized in June 1997 in the European Parliament on the situation of human rights in Tunisia, Tunisians were dispatched to Strasbourg to give Europe another image of their country.

A series of laudatory articles followed in the French press on the condition of women in Tunisia. In October 1997, during Ben Ali's official visit to France, the Tunisian regime's defenders also cited the status of women, while ignoring the criticisms of the organizations defending human rights:

Is the Tunisian regime feminist through political necessity and to mask the democratic deficit that it seems happy to entrench, or through its modernizing conviction?

In August 1994, during a conference devoted to women and the family, the Association tunisienne des femmes démocrates (ATFD) denounced the ambiguity of the forces in power and the use of religion to control the status of women in the country, criticizing foremost "the patriarchal oppression of women". Moreover, women attempted to rebel against the official discourse were quickly called to order, notably through the bias of a Tunisian press rigorously controlled by the authorities. The president of the ATFD, the lawyer Sana Ben Achour, explained in March 2010 that her organization was living in a

situation of being clamped down upon and strangled that means a breakdown of any possibility of dialogue with the public authorities.

She denounced among other things, the "police inclosure" of the ATFD headquarters and its women's university, and the fact that the association was prevented from staging a theatre production that was supposed to mark the March 8 International Women's Day. In this context, filmmaker Moufida Tlatli — made famous by her film The Silences of the Palace (1994) — was heavily criticized in the Tunisian magazine Réalités for having shown her scepticism towards the supposed feminism of Islam during a television program broadcast in France in October 1994:

When I was a child, explains Moufida Tlatli, Tunisian women were called 'the colonization of the colonized.' It was in thinking about my mother (to whom The Silences of the Palace is dedicated) and the taboos that prevailed throughout her life that I wrote the screenplay (...) it was understood: behind this denunciation of the lives of her ancestors, Moufida Tlatli is in fact speaking of the present. And what this calls into question, is the silence that, still today, stifles Tunisian women.

On August 13, 2003, the 47th anniversary of the enactment of the CSP, the Ligue tunisienne des droits de l'homme (in English: Tunisian League of Human Rights) declared :

We believe that total equality between men and women remains a fundamental claim.

== Fashion ==
Prior to the 2011 revolution, Tunisia restricted women's right to wear the hijab. Even though the population of Tunisia is 99% Muslim, and women in the Muslim world commonly wear hijabs, the governments of both Ben Ali and Habib Bourguiba pursued the eradication of public Islamic traditions, including hijab. In 1981 Habib Bourguiba ratified law no. 108 effectively banning Tunisian women from wearing hijab in state offices. In 1985, he went further and ratified law 108 extending this ban to educational establishments.

During Ben Ali's regime, the government began cracking down on females wearing the hijab. In 2008, Amnesty International reported that women were forced to remove their hijab before being allowed into schools, universities, workplaces and some were even forced to remove it on the street. The report goes further stating that scarfed women were denied entry to the Tunis International Book Fair and at times were taken to police stations and made to sign a written commitment to stop wearing the hijab. "Some of those who refused were assaulted by police officers".

While recent changes under the new government of the Ennahda Movement have lifted restrictions on wearing the hijab, a broader shift in social values toward Islamism has caused women to feel more restricted in many ways. A number of women complain that they can no longer wear skirts because of harassment by men. Additionally, they state that hijabs have become a social requirement instead of an option.

== Education ==
Although these facts appear to put women in Tunisia on par with Western women, only 26% of women are employed as of 2021. Women's minimal participation in the work force does not derive from lack of education. In fact, 91% of Tunisian women, between the ages of 15 and 24, are literate. Young women represent 59.5% of students enrolled in higher education in Tunisia. In addition, the level of illiteracy for girls and women ages ten years and over dropped from 96% in 1956 to 58.1% in 1984, 42.3% in 1994 then 31% in 2004 (the level among men was 14.8% in 2004). The main reason behind this change has been the number of girls enrolled in primary education: 52 female students for every 100 male students in 1965; as well as the number of female students enrolled in secondary schools: 83 female students for every 100 male students in 1989, an increase from the level of 37 in 1965. Compared to the regional statistic, only 65% of MENA women are literate. More women are enrolled in secondary school (81%) than their male counterparts (75%). Although, Tunisian girls have a high enrollment rate, many girls drop out during or after they complete their primary education. Tunisia's enrollment rates for girls are higher than its surrounding neighbors, including Algeria, Egypt, Morocco, Syria, Yemen, and even Lebanon and Jordan. Women in Tunisia are also less likely than men to enter a career in business, economics or engineering. This phenomenon may be due to the disconnect between content learned in school and needed skills to participate in the labor force.

== Women's participation in the work force ==
Women constitute 25% of the workforce of Tunisia in 2021, a decrease from 28% in 2015, an increase from 20.9% in 1989 and only 5.5% in 1966.

Female participation and mobility in the labor force are constrained by the socially acceptable behavior of women in Tunisia and even laws. For example, women are discouraged or prohibited by family members from traveling far from home (in both rural and urban environments). Indeed, traveling alone is not an option for a woman or girl. Therefore, given that a job involves commuting, often alone, to the location of work, for women this is socially unacceptable and/or prohibited. Certain Tunisian laws restrict the type of work women participate in, the number of hours they work as well as require a woman's husband or father to approve of her job and hours worked. The World Bank found that women in Tunisia and the surrounding region (MENA) do not use the same job search methods as men of the same region. Women are significantly less likely to use networking with a friend or contact an employer directly to obtain employment. The World Bank research found that women struggle with finding a suitable working environment because they fear sexual harassment and working long hours. Within the MENA region, the Tunisian government offers the shortest amount of time for paid maternal leave for women (30 days). Separate maternity leave laws apply to women who work in the public or private industry. Women who work as civil servants or public employees have 60 days of maternity leave while those women who work in the private industry only receive 30 days. In comparison, The Family and Medical Leave Act, in the United States, enables mothers (and fathers) to take up to 6 weeks.

They work in all areas of business, as well as the Army, the Civil Aviation or Military and police and represent 72% of pharmacists, 42% of the medical profession, 27% of judges, 31% of lawyers and 40% of university instructors. In addition, between 10,000 and 15,000 of them are entrepreneurs. However, unemployment affects women more than men since 16.7% of women work in private employment rather than the 12.9% rate of men as of 2004.

From 1999 to 2004, job creation for women grew at a rate of 3.21%, to produce an average of 19,800 jobs per year.

According to the United Nations Development Programme, only 51% of Tunisian women have access to official financial institutions. Additionally, women in micro and small businesses have significant hurdles in acquiring money.

== Post January 2011 ==
Immediately prior to the Tunisian revolution of 2011, women represented 14.89% of the government, 27.57% (59 of 214) of the elected members of the Chamber of Deputies elected on October 25, 2009, 27.06% of municipal councillors and 18% of the members of the Economic and Social Council.

Moreover, in the absence of a law on equality (after the Tunisian revolution of 2011), the principle of parity was adopted in April 2011 for the election of the Tunisian Constituent Assembly of 2011.

In 2017 a law was passed that, among other things, declared that men who had sex with underage girls would not be able to avoid being prosecuted by marrying those girls, changed the age of consent from 13 to 16, criminalized marital rape and sexual harassment, and made wage and work discrimination against women punishable by a fine of 2,000 Tunisian dinars ($817).

Currently many Tunisian feminists are worried that the rights they enjoyed before the revolution may disappear as the power vacuum is infiltrated with religiously zealous ex-pats returning to the country. Women such as Munjiyah al-Sawaihi and Fawzia Zouari, known Tunisian feminists, are worried that the Tunisian revolution will follow the past examples of Algeria and Iran where women who played active roles during the revolutionary period, however, lost their voice and ability to participate in the public sphere when the new regimes established strict Sharia Law.

== Ennahda and women ==
The Ennahda Movement is Tunisia's most popular Islamic party and the party with the largest number of seats in the Constituent Assembly. However, due to its foundation on Islamic thought, the party has gained the largest number of critics nationally and internationally, and specifically regarding women's rights. Since the 2011 revolution, the party stated the following in regards to Tunisian women and what would happen if they were to get elected:

- The party would not legalize polygamy. In fact, the party leader stated that "polygamy has been determined to be illegal" in (their interpretation) of the shariah law.
- Hijab will become legal in all areas of life in Tunisia, and will be a personal choice.
- Women will retain their right to wear whatever they want, "including bikinis".
- They will not amend the Status Code.

In addition, the party voted in favor of full gender equality in the October Elections, and they were the most effective of all parties in mobilizing women in rural areas. Rural areas are commonly dominated by males in the Arab world.

== Marry-your-rapist law ==
Until 2017, Article 227 of the Tunisia Criminal Code provided a rapist with exemption to avoid all investigations or legal consequences if he married his victim. Laws of this kind have been termed "marry-your-rapist" laws. There has been an increasing trend towards repealing laws providing this impunity, with Tunisia following suit in July 2017.

=== Background ===
Laws of this type are historically common and still exist around the globe. Tunisia is a nation that places great cultural importance on the chastity of women. In such cultures, the loss of chastity has significant societal consequences for the woman and her family; regardless of whether this violation has been non-consensual. The duty to be a virgin was found to be considered a "social rule to be maintained" by 90% of Tunisian women aged between 15 and 59 years.

Therefore, the rationale for marry-your-rapist laws, such as Article 227, is rooted in shielding the victim from the cultural shame of rape. Marriage is a way for the family to escape the "scandal" of what has occurred. Salma Nims, the secretary general of the Jordanian National Commission for Women, explained this state of affairs in saying, "a woman who is the victim of a sexual assault is actually considered responsible for the honour of the family and may have to get married to whoever assaulted her in order to protect that". Proponents believe Article 227 protected women as, in Tunisia, prospects of marriage decline considerably in the instance of rape. Thus, Article 227 was aimed at providing a victim with the opportunity of a husband despite the cultural taboo of a loss of virginity.

The Tunisian Government acknowledged that Article 227 was premised on striking a balance between the rights of the woman and those of the family. It was explained the law was motivated by consideration of the position of the victim and her family, however advantageous this may end up being for the perpetrator. Further, there is the view of a rejection of legal interference into the private affairs agreed to among the rapist, the victim and her family if marriage is settled upon as the solution. Under Article 227, a victim must still consent to the marriage, with the option available to her to refuse the marriage.

Marry-your-rapist laws raise debate as to the appropriateness of such laws in the cultural context of a country like Tunisia. Opponents of Article 227 in Tunisia criticise the "second assault on a rape survivor’s rights" that the law supports by trapping the victim in a marriage to her rapist. Issue has been raised with Article 227 as it assumes that the best remedy for a victim of rape is marriage, without consideration of her own rights to freedom, dignity and autonomy. Article 227 has also been condemned as providing immunity to rapists by encouraging private settlements between the victim's family and the rapist rather than reporting of the crime for prosecution. While the victim has the option to refuse the marriage, there may be significant pressure from her family to accept the marriage for provisional reasons, particularly in the case of the rape resulting in pregnancy. Frequently, fault is focused on the victim's actions to bring about the rape, thus creating a sense of responsibility for the cultural dishonour brought upon the family. Victims are often blamed and shamed into extracting a report of rape in favour of hiding the occurrence to conserve the honour of the victim's family.

=== Campaigns ===
Opposition to article 227 has been voiced through broader advocacy campaigns pressuring governmental action to end violence against women in Tunisia. On December 13, 2016, by authority of article 227, a Tunisian Court ordered a 13-year-old girl was to marry her 20-year-old rapist who had impregnated her. A fellow judge in the case made comment on the judgment, calling article 227 an antiquated law but accepting it must be applied. This decision ignited protests of public outrage in Tunisia calling for the revocation of article 227. The day following the Court's decision, politicians, legal experts and members of the public were involved in a protest demonstration outside the Tunisian Parliament building. In response to this political demonstration, the Tunisian Justice Minister, Ghazi Al-Jeribi, announced the Prosecutor General would file an objection to the Court's decision as Tunisia was in the process of developing changes to article 227.

Tunisian human rights organisations protested the decision on the basis that it violated international human rights treaties as well as Tunisian laws protecting the rights of children. Amnesty International raised concern that the law contravenes Tunisia's obligations under the Convention on the Rights of the Child to provide particular protection for children from sexual coercion and violence. The marriage of the 13-year-old victim to her 20-year-old rapist was also condemned for contravening Tunisia's international obligations to prevent marriage of a child under Article 16(2) of the Convention on Elimination of All Forms of Discrimination against Women and Article 23(2) of the International Covenant on Civil and Political Rights.

The Tunisian campaigns for repeal were supported by the collective action of regional feminist organisations such as the Tunisian Association of Democratic Women collaborating efforts with activist NGOs like the International Federation of Human Rights. The Tunisian Ministry for Women, Family and Children also called for the order to be nullified as a violation of article 20 of the Child Protection Code aimed at safeguarding interests of a minor.

Reform following public outcry for repeal has been seen worldwide, with Tunisia joining countries such as Lebanon, Costa Rica, Uruguay, Peru, Romania and France that have repealed marry-your-rapist laws. However, countries such as Algeria, Iraq, Kuwait, Bahrain, Palestine and Syria currently retain provisions providing perpetrators impunity from rape prosecution.

=== Legislative Reform ===
On July 26, 2017, Tunisia's Parliament accepted wide-ranging new legislation aimed at the protection of women against all forms of violence. The legislation consists of 43 articles in five chapters addressing gender-based violence. This law eliminates the impunity provided for perpetrators by repealing Article 227 of Tunisia's Penal Code, coming into effect in 2018. In the vein of protestor's arguments against Article 227, Parliament recognised in this legislative reform that psychological violence constitutes a form of violence against women. UN High Commissioner for Human Rights, Zeid Ra’ad Al Hussein, supported the introduction of the new law, even stating there is "no place in today’s world for such hideous laws".

The Committee on the Elimination of Discrimination against Women has appealed to Tunisian Parliament to amend article 227 since 2010, voicing concern about the impunity provided to perpetrators to allow them to benefit from their own violence. The law was carefully drafted over six months due to the social importance of such a change that has been advocated by activists for decades. Tunisian Parliament is unique as more than 30% of representatives are women, the highest female representation of any Arab country. Upon passage of the legislative reform, parliamentarians broke into cheers and chants of the Tunisian national anthem. The comprehensive law has been heralded as revolutionary, predicted to break significant ground in addressing women's rights issues in Tunisia.

However, commentators on the new reform have still voiced concerns that the legislation does not go far enough to address violence against women. Issue has been raised for the continuance of the social practice of marrying a victim to her rapist despite the legal abolition of a perpetrator's impunity. Due to the cultural stigma attached to rape in Tunisia, families may still view an arrangement of marriage as the favoured, more private solution. Experts consider legal abolition of marry-your-rapist laws only the first step in truly eradicating the occurrence of this practice. It has been said that raising social awareness of equality of women at the community level is required in conjunction with legal reform. Amnesty International voiced concern that Tunisian institutions still lacked adequate services to provide protection for child victims with the continued social practice of marrying the victim to her rapist. As a child is legally considered an adult once married, there is no ability for a child protection delegate to intercede to advocate for the child's continued medical or psychological care. However, as there is also stigma attached to psychological treatment, families of the victim will rarely make this provision for the child of their own accord. Therefore, some commentators on the abolition of marry-your-rapist laws in Tunisia consider there needs to be a conjunctive improvement to protective services for child victims of sexual violence in addition to the repeal of article 227.

== See also ==
- Feminism
- Marry your rapist law
- Campaign against the Lebanese rape-marriage law article 522
- Women in Africa

== Bibliography ==
- Mounira Charrad, "States and Women's Rights: The Making of Postcolonial Tunisia, Algeria, and Morocco" University of California Press, 2001 ISBN 978-0-520-22576-3
- Paula Holmes-Eber, "Daughters of Tunis: Women, Family, and Networks in a Muslim City", Westview Press, 2001 ISBN 0-8133-3944-8
- (in French) Sophie Bessis et Souhayr Belhassen, Femmes du Maghreb. L’enjeu, éd. Jean-Claude Lattès, Paris, 1992 ISBN 2-7096-1121-X
- (in French) Aziza Darghouth Medimegh, Droits et vécu de la femme en Tunisie, éd. L’Hermès, Lyon, 1992 ISBN 2-85934-339-3
- (in French) Pierre-Noël Denieuil, Femmes et entreprises en Tunisie. Essai sur les cultures du travail féminin, éd. L’Harmattan, coll. Socio-anthropologie, Paris, 2005 ISBN 2-7475-8284-1
- (in French) Andrée Doré-Audibert et Sophie Bessis, Femmes de Méditerranée, éd. Karthala, Paris, 1995 ISBN 2-86537-597-8

== Filmography ==
- (in French) Tunisie. Histoire de femmes, film de Feriel Ben Mahmoud, Alif Productions, Paris, 2005
