= Faculty of Medicine of Sousse =

Academic institution in Tunisia

Faculty of Medicine of Sousse (FMS)
- كلية الطب بسوسة
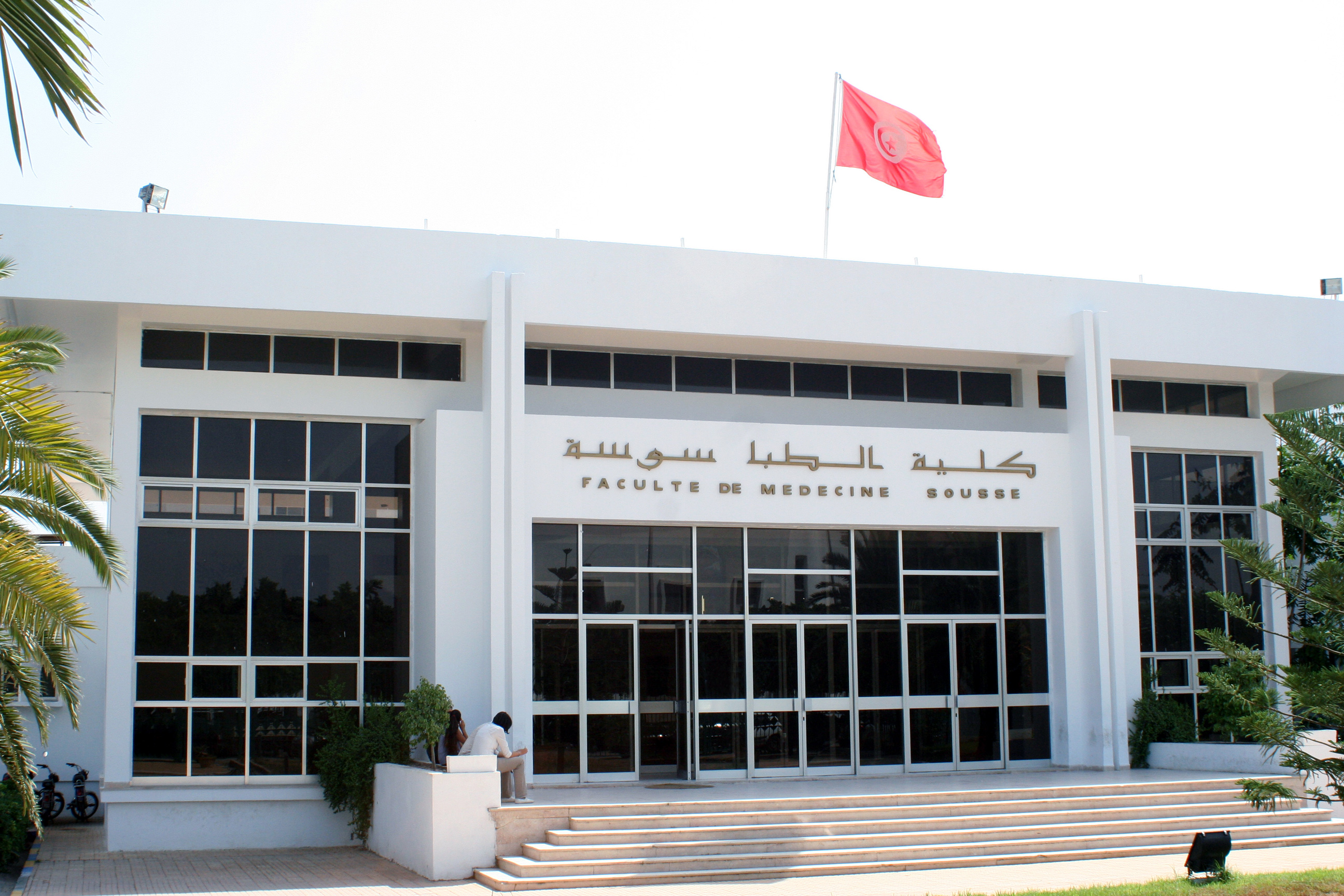
- FMS entrance.
- Other name: Faculté de Médecine de Sousse
- Type: Public
- Established: 1974
- Location: Sousse, Tunisia; 35°49′48″N 10°37′48″E
- Language: Arabic, French, English
- Website: www.medecinesousse.com
- Location within Tunisia

The Faculty of Medicine of Sousse (Arabic: كلية الطب بسوسة) or FMS, is a Tunisian university establishment created according to the law N°74-83 of December 11, 1974. Part of the University of Sousse.

== History ==
The faculty of medicine of Sousse including the faculty of medicine of Sfax was the first faculty established outside of Tunis. It is also the first higher education establishment located in Sousse, in the Tunisian Center.

Its first mission was the creation of opened environment and prepare its future doctors for internal medicine trainings according to an approach which is both curative and preventive. Also a community medicine department was created within the first year.

== See also ==
- Medicine School of Tunis
- Faculty of Medicine of Monastir
- Faculty of Medicine of Sfax
- University of Sousse
