= Manceau =

Manceau may refer to:

- A male denizen of Le Mans, France
- A male denizen of the traditional province of Maine, France
- Pays Manceau (Manceau Country), an intermunicipality that incorporates some of the communes of the Sarthe department in France
- Vincent Manceau (born 1989), French footballer

== See also ==
- Manceaux (disambiguation)
