= Juliette Smaja Zérah =

Tunisian lawyer (1891–1974)

- Born: Sultana Juliette Smaja; March 14, 1891; Tunis, Tunisia
- Died: May 16, 1974 (aged 83); Boulogne-Billancourt, France
- Occupation: Lawyer

Juliette Smaja Zérah (March 14, 1891 – May 16, 1974) was Tunisia's first female lawyer.

== Biography ==
Born on March 14, 1891 in Tunis, Juliette Smaja was the eldest daughter of Mardochée Smaja (1864-1923), descendant of a chief rabbi of Tunisia with the same name, and Zaïra Slama. In 1911, she became the first Tunisian woman to study law at the University of Aix-en-Provence. She obtained her law degree in 1914 and became the first woman to be admitted to the Tunis bar in 1916. Her success should not conceal the difficulties she faced, as a woman and as a Tunisian, in completing her studies and then practicing law.

She married Élie Zérah, who like her had passed through the same faculty; he was also an activist and member of the Destour, who had been part of a delegation that came to present their demands to the Resident General of France in Tunisia, Lucien Saint, in 1921, and then of the Destour delegation to the French authorities in Paris, the second such delegation.

Along with other former Tunisian students from Aix-en-Provence, the couple contributed to the newspaper La Justice, launched by Mardochée Smaja in 1907 to defend the political and legal rights of Jews in Tunisia. Mardochée Smaja was also a member of the Union judéo-musulmane, which was formed in 1920. Despite this organization, and despite the Destour's openness to the Tunisian Jewish community, notably through Élie Zerah's presence within it, a rift gradually emerged between Tunisian Jews and Muslims in the interwar period, particularly on issues of French nationality and secularism, with the newspaper La Justice, for example, advocating the separation of religion from the public sphere. Between 1921 and 1923, the French colonial authorities decided to broaden the opportunities for Tunisian Jews to acquire French nationality, without however setting up a mechanism for collective naturalization, as had been done in Algeria with the Crémieux Decree. In so doing, the authorities divided the Tunisian elite in the interwar period, thwarting Italian influence in Tunisia, while at the same time allowing the Bey of Tunis to benefit from individual naturalization opportunities. Mardochée Smaja died in 1923.

In this context, Juliette Smaja Zérah, who in the second half of the 1910s and early 1920s had been one of the leading figures of women's emancipation in Tunisia, paving the way for others among the legal community, gradually slipped into the traditional mold of the housewife, as social and political conditions did not lend themselves, in her eyes, to any other evolution.

She died on May 16, 1974 in Boulogne-Billancourt.

== Bibliography ==
- Land, Joy (2010). "Smadja, Juliette". In Stillman, Norman A.; Ackerman-Lieberman, Phillip Isaac (eds.). Encyclopedia of Jews in the Islamic World. Leiden: Brill. ISBN 978-90-04-17678-2. OCLC 650852958.
