= Hamidah =

Hamidah or Hamida is the female version of the Arabic name Hamid. It may refer to:

== Places ==
- Hamidah, Yemen, a village in Yemen

== People ==
- Fatimah Hasan Delais (1915-1953), an Indonesian novelist who wrote under the pen name Hamidah
- Wanda Hamidah (1977-), an Indonesian politician and activist
- Hamida Nana (1946-), a Syrian writer
