= Faculty of Medicine of Tunis =

Public medical school in Tunisia

Coordinates: 36.8036°N 10.1563°E

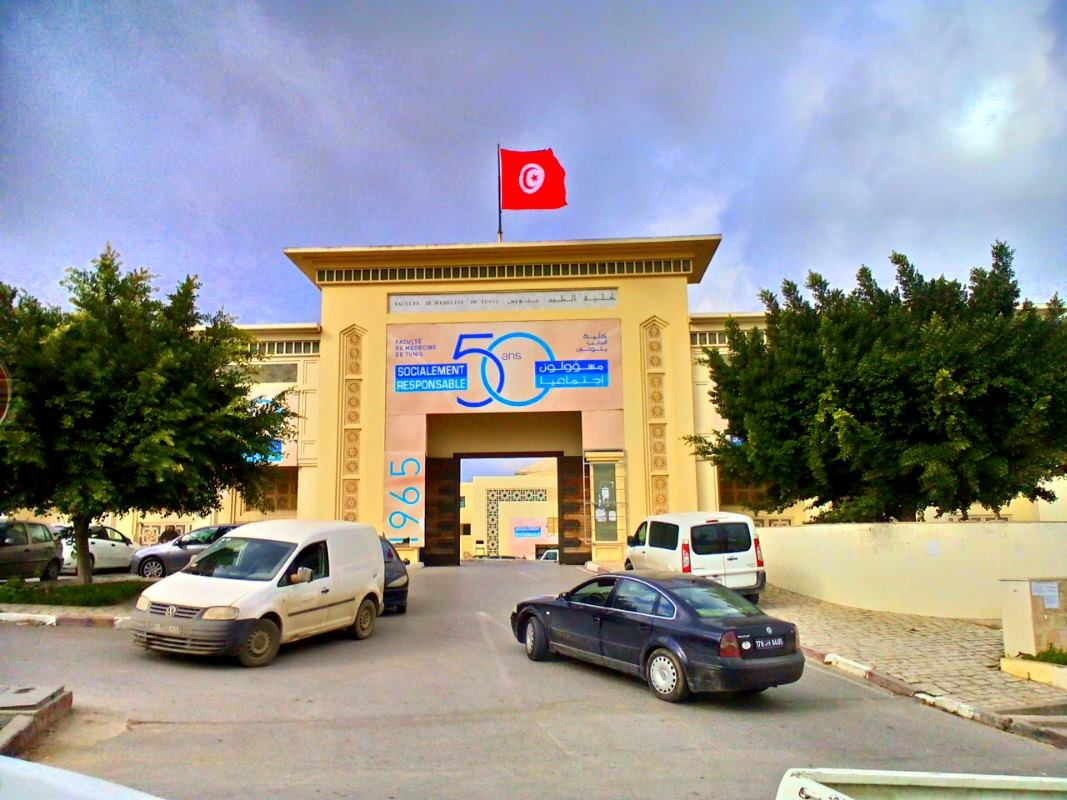
- Type: Public University
- Established: 1964
- Dean: Mohamed Jouini
- Location: Tunis, Tunisia
- Affiliations: Tunis El Manar University
- Website: www.fmt.rnu.tn

The Faculty of Medicine of Tunis (Arabic: كلية الطب بتونس; French: faculté de médecine de Tunis, FMT) is one of the four medical schools in Tunisia and the oldest among them. It is a public institution that belongs to the Tunis El Manar University.

== History ==
The school was founded in 1964 with only 59 students enrolled. The courses took place in the human and social sciences faculty of Tunis in that year. In 1965, they changed into the University Hospital Charles-Nicolle. Amor Chadli was the first dean of the school.

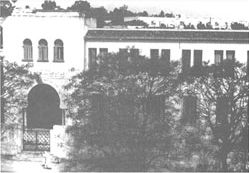
Medicine School of Tunis in 1964–65

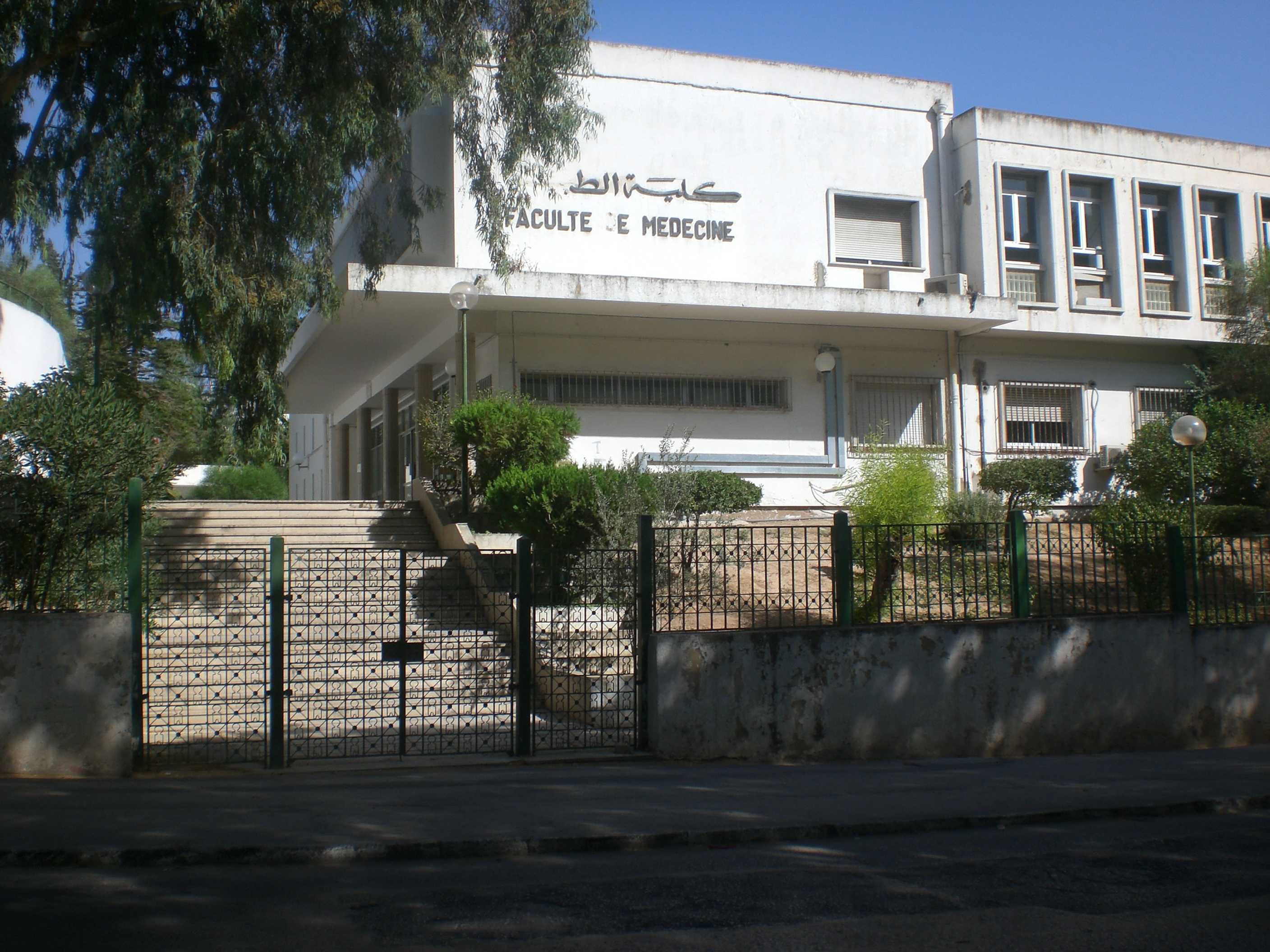
Old building of the Medicine School of Tunis

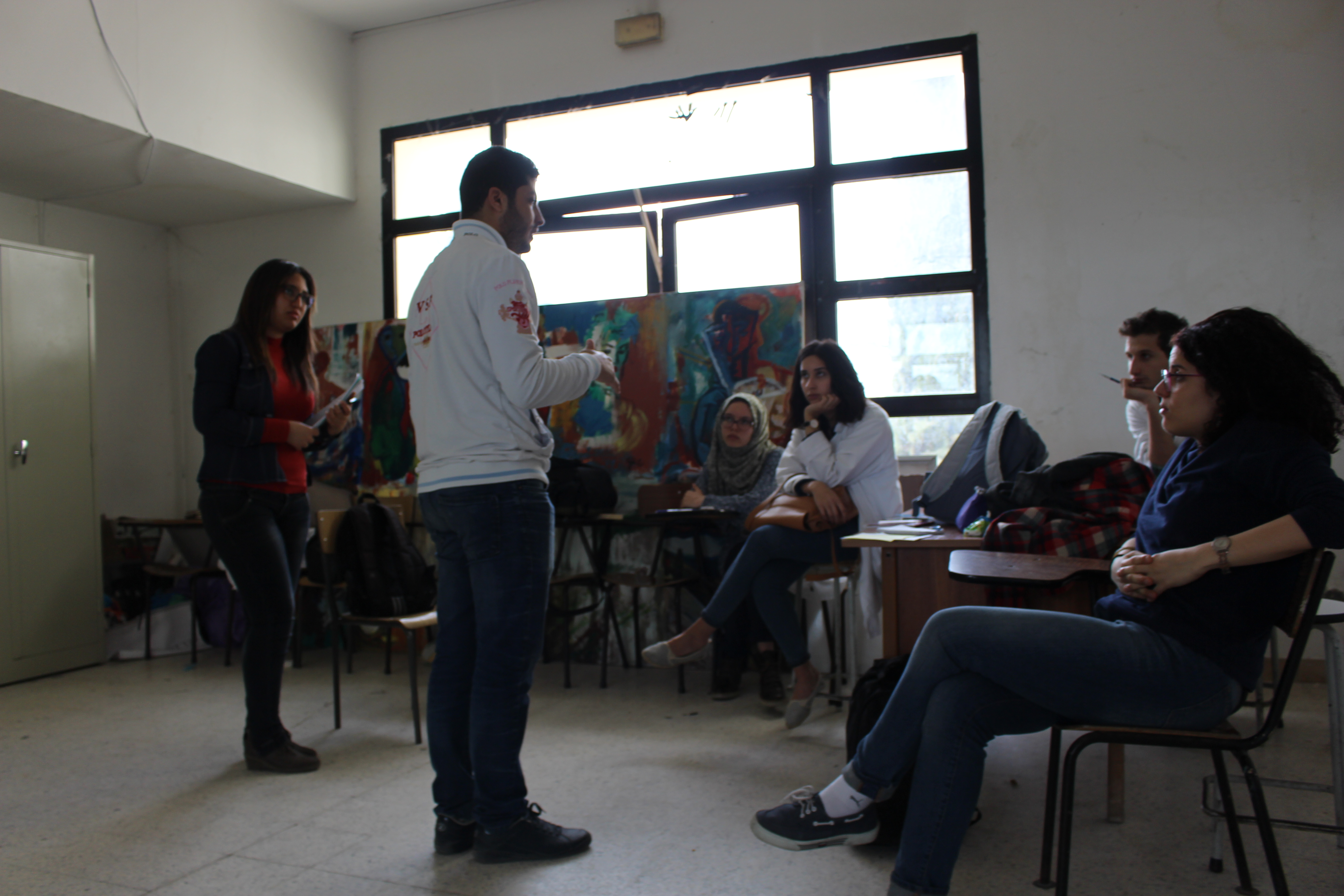
Debating club at the medicine school of Tunis.

== Location ==
The school is located in 15 Djebel Lakhdhar Street La Rabta 1007 in Tunis .

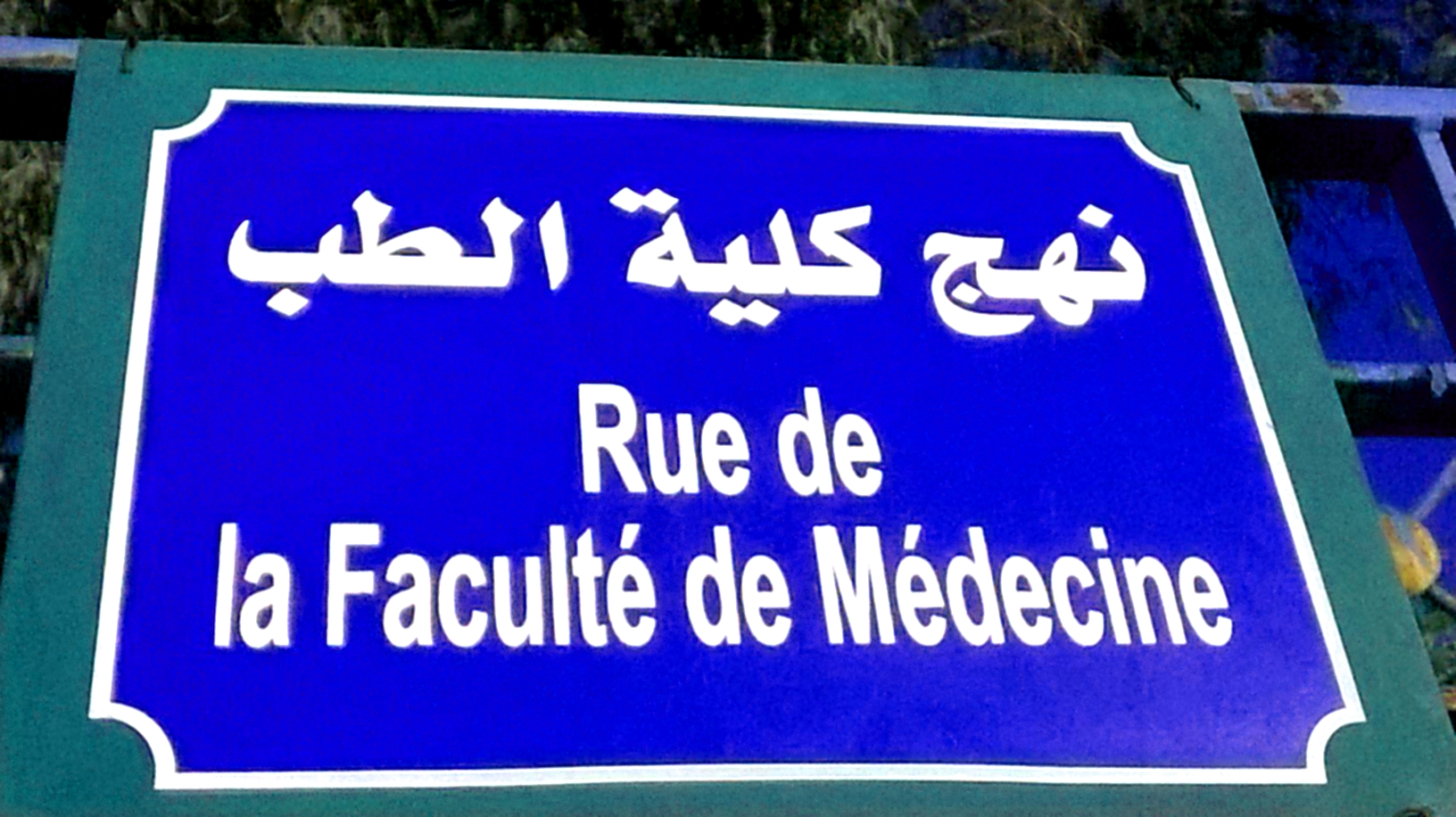
Medicine School of Tunis Street

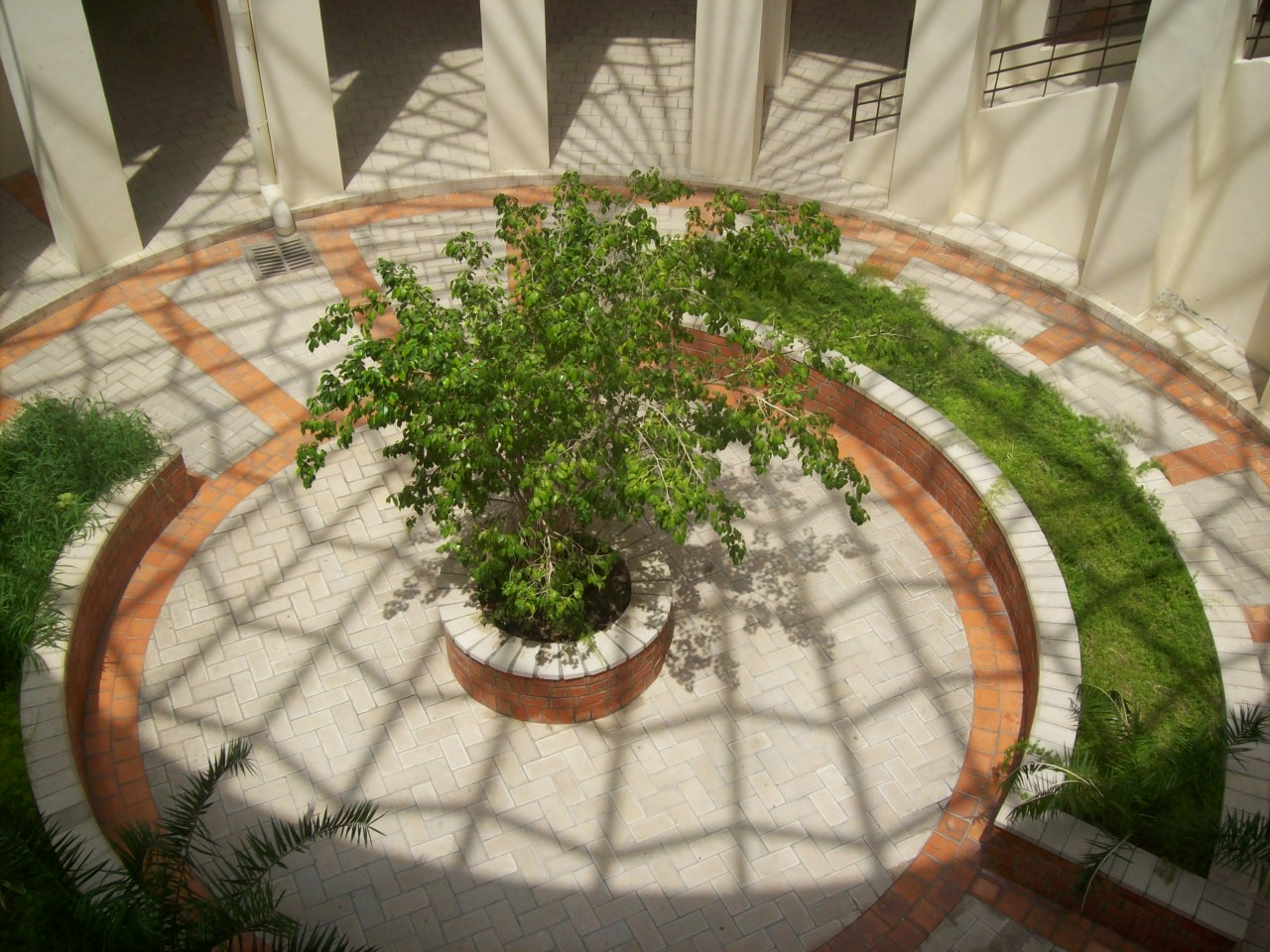
Hall of the Medicine School of Tunis

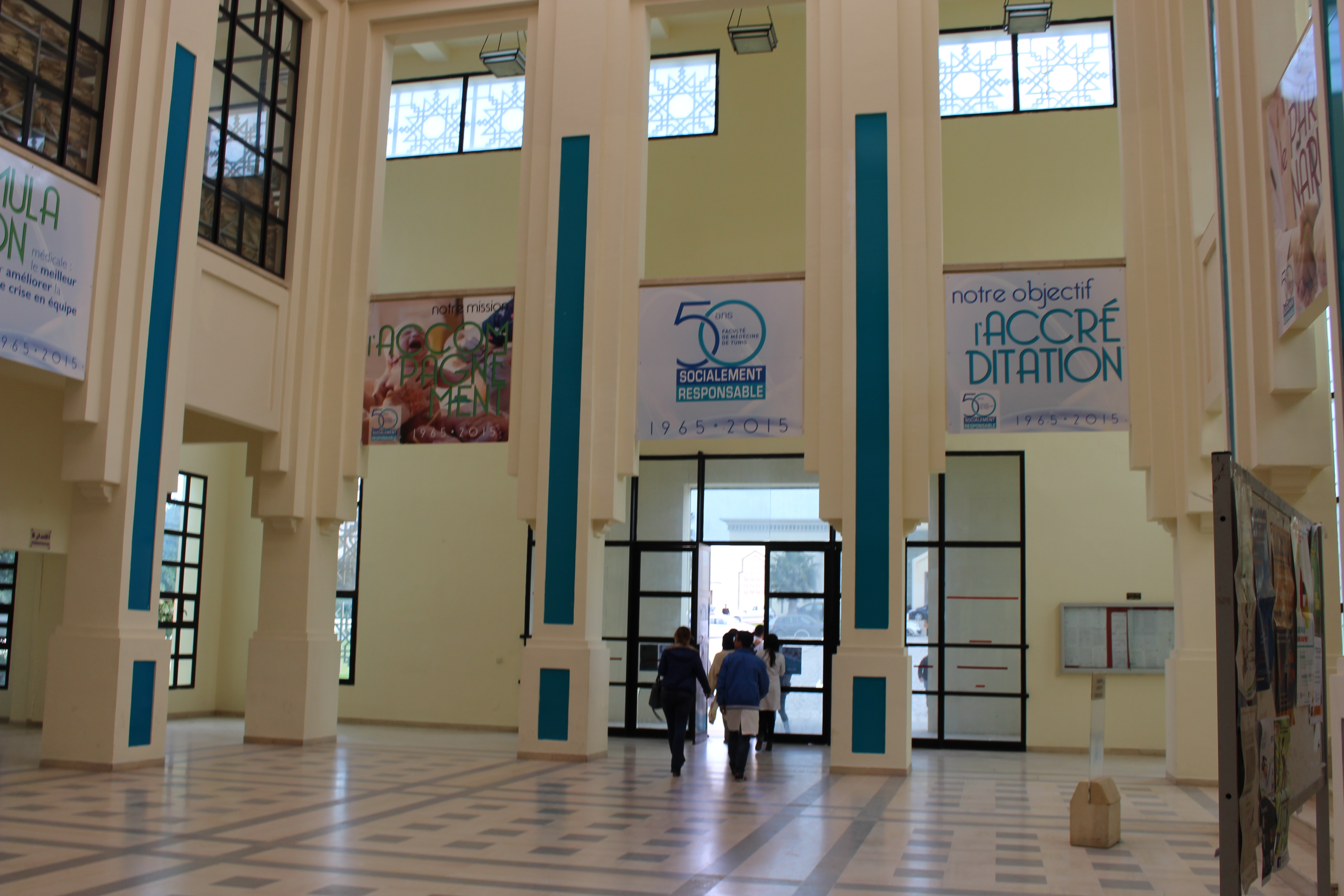
Main hall of the school

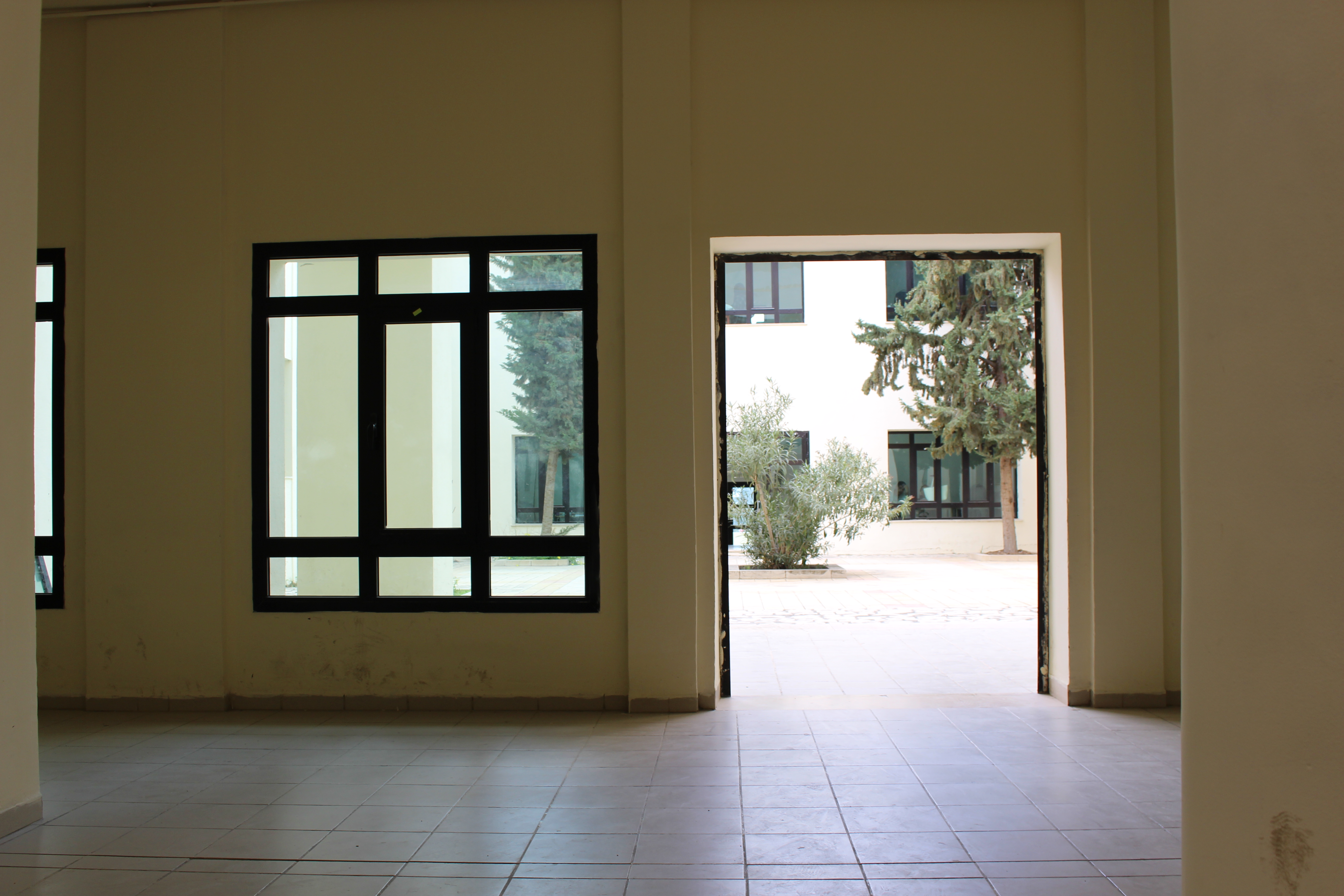
An outdoor space in the labs department

== Deans ==
Since its foundation, the Faculty of Medicine of Tunis had eight deans.

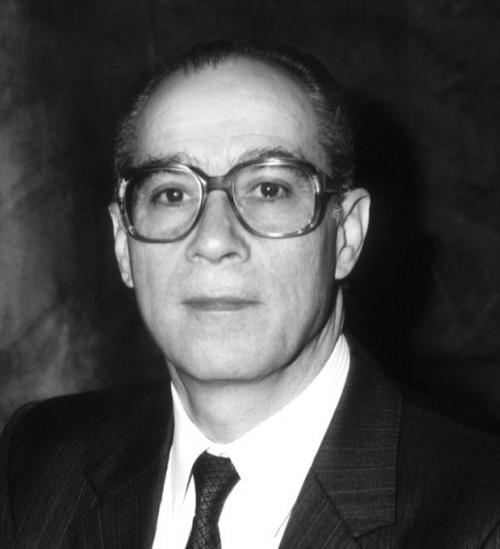
Amor Chadli

- 1964–1971 : Amor Chadli (anatomo-pathologist)
- 1971–1974 : Mongi Ben Hamida (neurologist)
- 1974–1976 : Amor Chadli (anatomo-pathologist)
- 1976–1977 : Zouhair Essafi (surgeon)
- 1977–1986 : Hassouna Ben Ayed (nephrologist and internist)
- 1986–1994 : Abdelaziz Ghachem (specialist in medical work and forensic medecine)
- 1994–2000 : Chalbi Belkahia (pharmacologist)
- 2000–2005 : Rachid Mechmèche (physiologist)
- 2005–2011 : Abdeljelil Zaouche (surgeon)
- 2011–2017 : Ahmed Maherzi (pediatrician)
- 2017–2024 : Mohamed Jouini (surgeon)
- 2024–Present : Iheb Labbene (anesthesiologist and critical care physician)

== Notable people ==
- Habiba Djilani
- Sleim Ammar

== See also ==
- Tunis El Manar University
- Faculty of Medicine of Monastir
- Faculty of Medicine of Sfax
- Faculty of Medicine of Sousse
