= Toxoplasma lactate dehydrogenase 1 regulatory UTR =

LDH1 5′UTR
- Predicted secondary structure and sequence conservation of LDH1 5′UTR

Identifiers
- Rfam: RF02697

Other data
- Domain: Bacteria
- GO: GO:0045182
- SO: SO:0005836,SO:0000204
- PDB structures: PDBe

In Toxoplasma gondii the translational repression of lactate dehydrogenase 1 (LDH1) was discovered to be mediated through its 5′UTR. A small nucleotide regulatory RNA hairpin was shown to be essential for the repression. It is possible that this hairpin may act as the nucleation site for the binding of a trans-acting factor(s) that allow for the translational repression.
