= Hamida Omarova =

Azerbaijani actress (born 1957)

Həmidə Ömerova
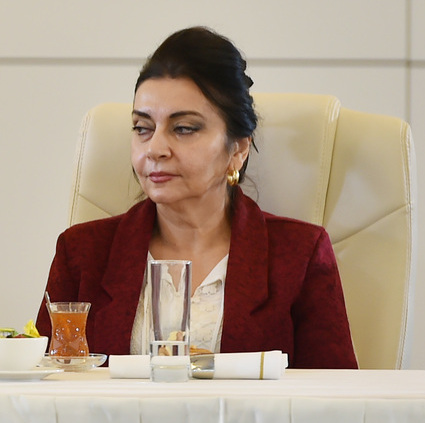
- Ömərova in 2019
- Born: 25 April 1957 (age 68); Baku, Azerbaijan
- Occupation: Actress

Hamida Mammad qizi Omarova (Azerbaijani: Həmidə Ömərova, born 25 April 1957 in Baku) is an Azerbaijani actress.

== Early life ==
Hamida Omarova was born to a family of teachers, Mammad and Nasiba Omarov. Her parents met at university, where both of them studied foreign languages, and went on to have four children, three of whom died in their infancy. When Hamida was born, her parents visited the Sufi Hamid shrine in Qazakh and after being sure the newborn would survive, they named her after the sanctuary. Following her parents' divorce in 1960 and her father's permanent departure to his native Gazakh, Hamida Omarova was raised by her mother and grandmother. After graduating from high school, she enrolled at Baku State University to study philology. While finishing her first year in 1975, she entered an academic contest along with 300 other people and was among the 15 contestants who were admitted to the Gerasimov Institute of Cinematography in Moscow.

== Career ==
Omarova's first role was in a short film entitled The Dentist in 1977. Since then, she has starred in over 30 films and became the most successful Azerbaijani actress of the decade, performing at times in up to 4 movie shootings simultaneously. In Russia, she is known mostly for acting in Yuli Gusman's film Gorkhma, saninlayam / Не бойся, я с тобой ("Don't Be Afraid, I Am Here For You", 1981), staged in Gakh, Azerbaijan. Her performance was rewarded with numerous awards, including that of a People's Artist of Azerbaijan. With the collapse of the Soviet Union in 1991, Azerbaijan's movie industry experienced severe decline. This became both a career decay and a psychological ordeal for Omarova. After going through a period of depression, she got married in 1992 and gave birth to a son. At the same time, she hosted the late night show Retro, a weekly review of classic movies from Azerbaijan and abroad. In 2006 Omarova was elected president of the Azerbaijani Union of Cinematographers.
