= Habiba Djilani =

Habiba Djilani Horchani (Arabic: حبيبة الجيلاني الحرشاني), (17 September 1949, in Tunis – 12 September 2007, in Tunis) was the first Tunisian female surgeon and the first Tunisian and African thoracic surgeon.

== Studies ==
Habiba Djilani was born into a Tunisian bourgeois family of 19th century merchant craftsmen. Her grandfather Hadi is a renowned Qaid and her father, Ali, is a businessman specialized in textiles and clothing. Her brother Hedi is a businessman, syndicalist and politician.

She studied at Lycée Carnot in Tunis, where she obtained her high school diploma in June 1967.

In June 1969, she received a university degree in natural sciences then began her medical studies at the Medicine School of Tunis.

In October 1977, she passed the national medical residency exam and specialized in general and thoracic surgery then moved to the Marie-Lannelongue Surgical Center in France. Her thesis in medicine is about Trauma of the liver.

She became assistant professor of medicine in 1981 and worked in the General Surgery Department of Charles-Nicolle Hospital in Tunis, as part of Professor Ennabli's team, then in the cardiothoracic surgery department at Abderrahmen-Mami Hospital.

== Functions ==
She is a member of various organizations, including the Tunisian Red crescent and also the Ministry of Public Health. She wrote many medical articles in the field of thoracic surgery in several Tunisian, French and international medical journals.

== Tribute ==
In 20 October 2007, a tribute was paid to her forty days after her death at the faculty of medicine of Tunis, where a room was named in her honor.
