= Mongi Ben Hamida =

- Born: February 1, 1928; Kelibia, Tunisia
- Died: May 4, 2003 (aged 75)
- Education: Sadiki College; Paris School of Medicine; Albert Eistein College of Medicine
- Medical career
- Field: Neurology; Neuropsychiatry

Mongi Ben Hamida (Arabic: منجي بن حميدة), born 1 February 1928 in Kelibia, and died on May 4, 2003, was a Tunisian neurologist and neuropsychiatrist.

== Education ==
After finishing his primary education in Kairouan, Ain drahem and Kelibia, Mongi Ben Hamida completed his secondary education at Sadiki College, where he got his baccalaureate degree in 1948. Later, he enrolled in medical studies at the Medical School of Paris (divided in 1970) where he specialized in neurology.

His thesis on the dento-olivary pair in 1965 won him a Prix de Thèse (thesis prize) and quickly became an international clinical and neuropathological reference.

Mongi Ben Hamida held a diploma of advanced studies in histology and cytology under the direction of Professor René Couteaux.

== Medical career ==
During his stay in France, Mongi Ben Hamida worked as a clinic chief at the Salpêtrière hospital, in the unit of Professor Raymond Garcin, then in Professor Boudin's, a great master of French neurology. Simultaneously, he joined Michel Fardeau's research program on Myopathies as a collaborator at the National Institute of Health and Medical Research. Later, he moved to New York City, where he completed a one-year internship as an associate professor at the Albert Einstein College of Medicine.

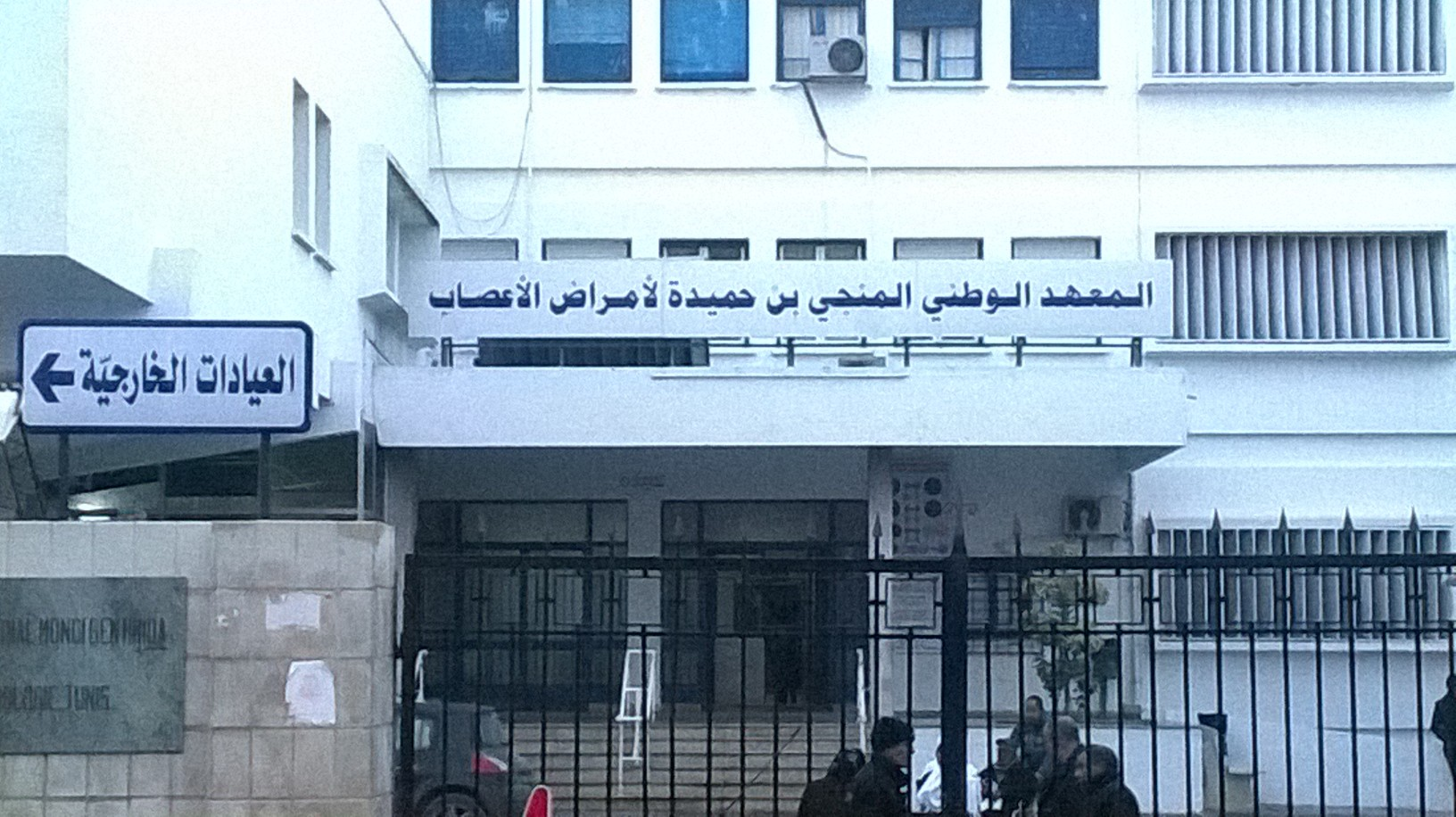
National Institute of Neurology of Tunis

Returning to Tunis in 1970, he began lecturing at the medicine school of Tunis, where he later was elected dean (1971-1974). In 1974, he founded the National Institute of Neurology of Tunis where his research on Tunisian myopaths earned him international recognition. It was with his team that he discovered a rare form Duchenne myopathy, which at first raised debates on the accuracy of the results. It was only in 1992, following the discovery of the myopathy gene by Dr. Kamel Ben Othman, a member of his team, that the whole community agreed by confirming the Tunisian team's earlier conclusions. It was also the case for later discoveries, such as juvenile amyotrophic lateral sclerosis (described in 1984 and then in 1990 with three phenotypic forms), Charcot-Marie-Tooth disease (a study led by his successor, the Professor Fayçal Hentati) and spinocerebellar heredo-degeneracy, Friedreich's ataxia with vitamin E deficiency (in 1993 and whose gene is located the same year by his wife Christiane Ben Hamida).

All these achievements proved the unique interest that Mongi Ben Hamida held for degenerative diseases since 1976. These were pathologies that almost all neurologists of that time around the world neglected and did not care to teach at medicine schools, since according to them, these diseases were of complex classifications, incurable and their handling would result in losses to the health budget. Indeed, this represented a great obstacle for Ben Hamida during the conduction of his research, since he could not rely on the support of the local and international scientific communities, a situation which, at times, prevented him from sharing his results and articles in scientific journals.

Throughout his time as Chief Physician at the Neurology Institute (until 1995), he was known for his professionalism, his efforts in training his students and his exceptional behavior towards his patients.

He was also a Knight in the French Legion d'Honneur.

He also chaired the Arab and Pan-African Neurological Sciences Associations and is elected vice-president of the World Federation of Neurology.

== Political career ==
Mongi Ben Hamida was the mayor of Kelibia, his hometown, as well as minister of public health from 1977 to 1979.

== Tribute ==
The institute he founded took his name posthumously on May 12, 2012.
