= K. J. Hamida Khanam =

Bangladeshi politician

Member of Parliament for Reserved Women's Seat-20
- In office 5 March 1991 – 24 November 1995
- In office 19 March 1996 – 30 March 1996

Personal details
- Born: c. 1940
- Died: 11 September 2015 (aged 75)
- Political party: Bangladesh Nationalist Party

K. J. Hamida Khanam (c. 1940 – 11 September 2015) was a Bangladeshi politician belonging to Bangladesh Nationalist Party. She was a member of the Jatiya Sangsad.

== Biography ==
Hamida Khanam was elected as a member of the Jatiya Sangsad from Reserved Women's Seat-20 in the fifth Jatiya Sangsad election. She was also elected as a member of the Jatiya Sangsad from Reserved Women's Seat-20 in the sixth general election of Bangladesh.

Khaleda Khanam died on 11 September 2015 at Eden Multicare Hospital in Dhaka at the age of 75.
