= Charles Nicolle =

French bacteriologist who received the Nobel Prize in Medicine (1866–1936)

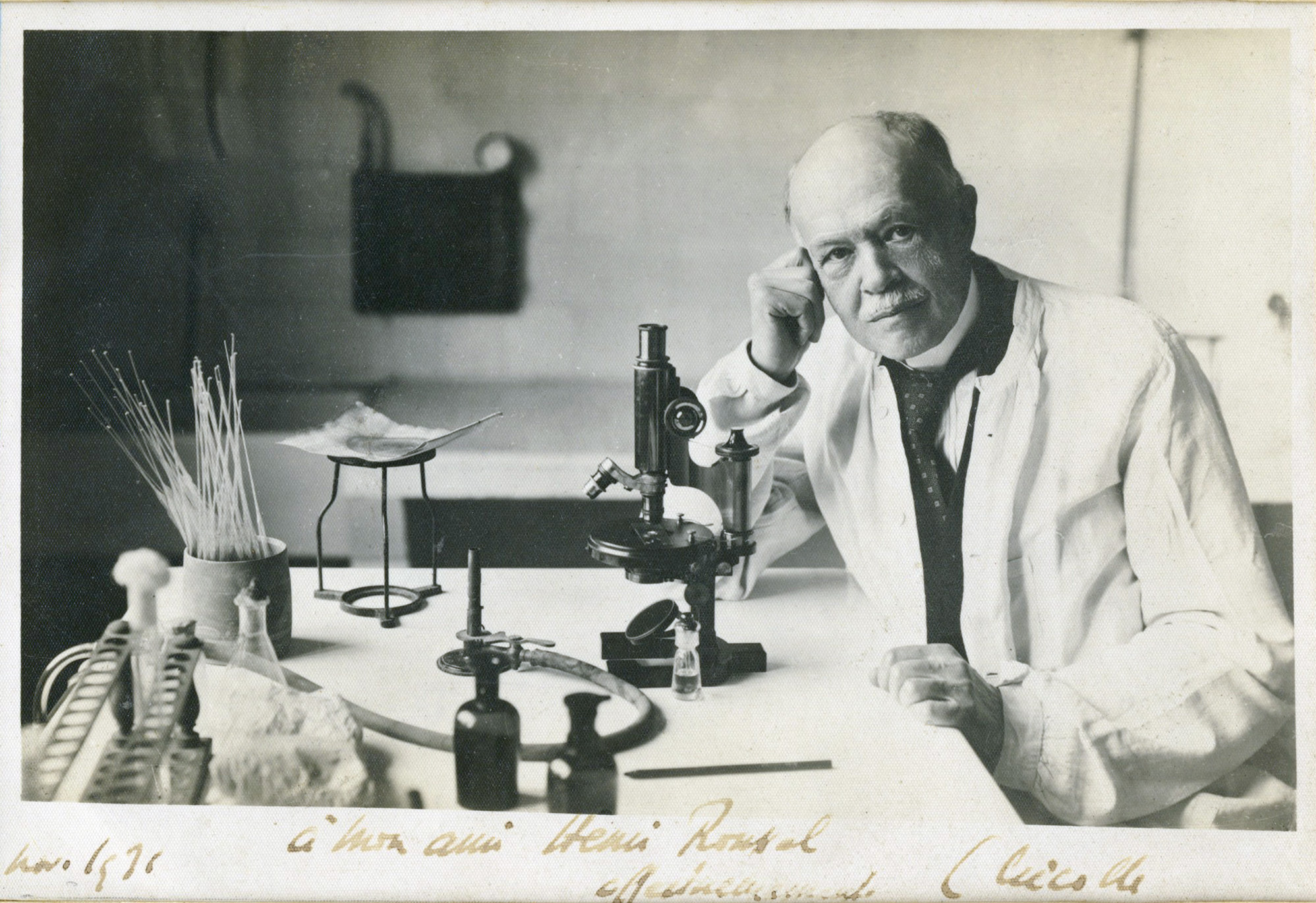
- Born: Charles Jules Henri Nicolle; 21 September 1866; Rouen, French Empire
- Died: 28 February 1936 (aged 69); Tunis, French Tunisia
- Education: University of Paris
- Known for: Epidemic typhus
- Father: Eugène Nicolle
- Awards: Nobel Prize in Physiology or Medicine (1928)
- Scientific career
- Fields: Bacteriology
- Workplaces: Pasteur Institute of Tunis

Charles Jules Henri Nicolle (21 September 1866 – 28 February 1936) was a French bacteriologist who received the Nobel Prize in Medicine for his identification of lice as the transmitter of epidemic typhus.

== Family ==
Nicolle was born to Aline Louvrier and Eugène Nicolle in Rouen, France and was raised as part of a middle-class family that valued education. He had two other siblings – his older brother, Maurice Nicolle (a medical microbiologist, professor at the Pasteur Institute in Paris, and Director of the Bacteriological Institute of Constantinople), and his younger brother, Marcel Nicolle (an art critic).

Nicole later married Alice Avice in 1895 and had two children, Marcelle (b. 1896) and Pierre (b. 1898), both of whom also went on to enter the medical field.

== Studies and career ==
The earliest educational influences on Nicolle were from his father, a doctor at a Rouen hospital. Nicolle later received his education from the Lycée Pierre Corneille in Rouen, followed by his medical degree from the Pasteur Institute of Paris in 1893. At this point he returned to Rouen, as a member of the Medical Faculty until 1896 and then as Director of the Bacteriological Laboratory from 1896 to 1902. Around this time, Nicolle also became increasingly deaf. This impeded his interactions with patients, which motivated him to develop the laboratory side of his work. He did just that in 1903, when he became Director of the Pasteur Institute in Tunis and conducted his Nobel Prize-winning work on typhus, bringing Hélène Sparrow with him as laboratory chief. He was still director of the Institute when he died in 1936.

=== Directing the Pasteur Institute in Tunis ===
Before Nicolle took on the position of leading the Pasteur Institute in Tunis, the Pasteur Institute in Paris remained the predominant centre for research in France as it aimed to combine medical research, teaching, and public service (treatment of diseases) under Pasteurian missionary principles. However, under Nicolle’s guidance over the next 33 years, the 'sister' Institute in Tunis quickly became an international centre of its own for the production of vaccines used against infectious diseases and for medical research.

Nicolle’s success in expanding the Pasteur Institute in Tunis lies primarily in his deviation from the traditional Pasteurian ideology that mandated that medical aid and research be done in a nonprofit manner. Nicolle instead actively sought to build relations with the local Tunisian and French healthcare officials and organized the Institute such that other medical functions (such as caring for sick patients) would monetarily support the Institute's ongoing laboratory research. Doing so gave him autonomy to run the Institute without relying on public or governmental funds. As the Institute grew more financially stable, Nicolle tackled the diseases and public health concerns that were prevalent in the local region, shared research findings and resources with the Paris Institute, and expanded his scientific writings into a journal called the Archives de l’Institut de Tunis. He also became a key point of contact for the French government when new epidemics arose that required his intervention – such as in the malaria epidemic of 1906 and the cholera outbreak of 1907.

During this time, Nicolle also undertook two major projects that would come to define his role in the scientific community – the discovery of the mode of transmission of typhus (an infectious disease prevalent throughout North Africa and the Mediterranean Basin at that time) and the production of vaccines.

=== Discovery of the vector transmitting typhus ===
Nicolle's discovery came about first from his observation that, while epidemic typhus patients were able to infect other patients inside and outside the hospital, and their very clothes seemed to spread the disease, they were no longer infectious when they had had a hot bath and a change of clothes. Once he realized this, he reasoned that it was most likely that lice were the vector for epidemic typhus.

Because studying the transmission of typhus required that the parasite be alive (needed a human host), scientists were only able to study it during epidemic times. However, Nicolle found that the chimpanzee served as a suitable alternate host for this study since it was genetically similar to humans, and in June 1909, Nicolle tested his theory by infecting a chimpanzee with typhus, retrieving the lice from it, and placing it on a healthy chimpanzee. Within 10 days, the second chimpanzee had typhus as well. After repeating his experiment, he was sure of it: lice were the carriers. As Nicolle continued his ongoing research on the disease, he later switched to using guinea pigs as his model organism instead of chimpanzees as they were just as susceptible to infection and were also smaller and cheaper.

An important finding from further research showed that the major transmission method was not louse bites but excrement: lice infected with typhus turn red and die after a couple of weeks, but in the meantime, they excrete a large number of microbes. When a small quantity of this is rubbed on the skin or eye, an infection occurs.

Nicolle’s work was not only influential in containing the typhus epidemics that occurred in the region but also helped scientists distinguish the typhus fever caused by lice from murine typhus, which is transmitted by fleas.

=== Attempt at a vaccine ===
Nicolle surmised that he could make a simple vaccine by crushing up the lice and mixing it with blood serum from recovered patients. He first tried this vaccine on himself, and when he stayed healthy he tried it on a few children (because of their better immune systems), who developed typhus but recovered.

He did not succeed in his effort to develop a practical vaccine. The next step would be taken by Rudolf Weigl in 1930.

Despite being unable to develop a vaccination against typhus, Nicolle did make several other key discoveries in the field of vaccination. He was the first to determine that sodium fluoride was a good reagent to sterilize parasites (so that they are no longer infectious) while also preserving their structure (to use in vaccines). Using this method, he developed vaccines for gonorrhea, some staphylococcal infections, and cholera. These vaccines were not only used throughout France but were also sent worldwide.

== Accomplishments ==
Nicolle's major accomplishments in bacteriology and parasitology were:

- The discovery of the transmission method of typhus fever
- The introduction of a vaccination for Malta fever
- The discovery of the transmission method of tick fever
- His studies of cancer, scarlet fever, rinderpest, measles, influenza, tuberculosis and trachoma.
- Identification of the parasitic organism Toxoplasma gondii within the tissues of the gundi (Ctenodactylus gundi), which is commonly found in AIDS patients
- His study of the parasitic microorganism Leishmania tropica that caused the Oriental sore (a type of skin boil)

== Additional information ==
=== Major works ===
During his life Nicolle wrote a number of non-fiction and bacteriology books, including:

- Le Destin des Maladies infectieuses (1933)
- La Nature, conception et morale biologiques (1934)
- Responsabilités de la Médecine (1935)
- La Destinée humaine (1936)

He also wrote fiction and philosophy throughout his life, including:

- Le Pâtissier de Bellone (1913)
- Les deux Larrons (1929)
- Les Contes de Marmouse (1930)

=== Religious views ===
Baptized a Catholic, Nicolle left the faith when he was twelve. Starting in 1934, he felt spiritual anxiety, and he was reconciled with the Church in August 1935 after communicating with a Jesuit priest.
