= Amor Chadli =

Tunisian physician and politician (1925–2019)

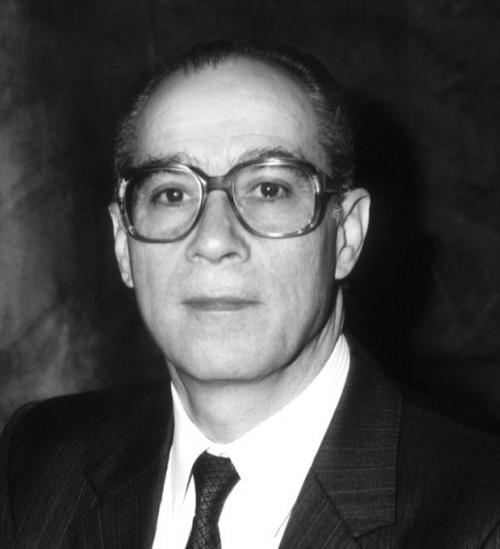
Amor Chadli

Amor Chadli (14 May 1925 – 8 November 2019) was a Tunisian physician and politician from Tunis who served as Minister of Education from 1986 to 1987. He also served as director of the Pasteur Institute of Tunis between 1963 and 1988. Chadli was the founding dean of the Medicine School of Tunis 1964 from 1971, and returned to the deanship from 1974 to 1976.
