= Hamida Nana =

Syrian writer

Hamida Na'na (born 1946) is a Syrian writer and journalist. Her name also appears as Hamidah Nana.

She was born in Idlib and studied Arabic at Damascus University. She was employed as a journalist by the Syrian Ministry of Information. She then went to Paris, where she worked for UNESCO and was a reporter for the Lebanese newspaper Al Safir.

In 1970, she published Anashid imra'a la ta'rif al-farah (Hymns of a joyless woman), a collection of poems. She published the novel al-Watan fi-l-'Aynan (The Homeland) in 1979 and then the novel Man Yajru ala al-Shawq (Who dares to yearn) in 1989.

She also published a collection of interviews Hiwarat ma`a Mofakiri al-Gharb (Conversations with Western Thinkers) (1989) and two works of political non-fiction: al-Subh al-Dami fi Adan (Bloody morning in Aden) (1988) and Tunis al-'aqi zaman al-'asifa (Tunisia: of reason in the time of the storm) (1997).
