= Pasteur Institute of Tunis =

Medical research institute in Tunisia

- معهد باستور بتونس
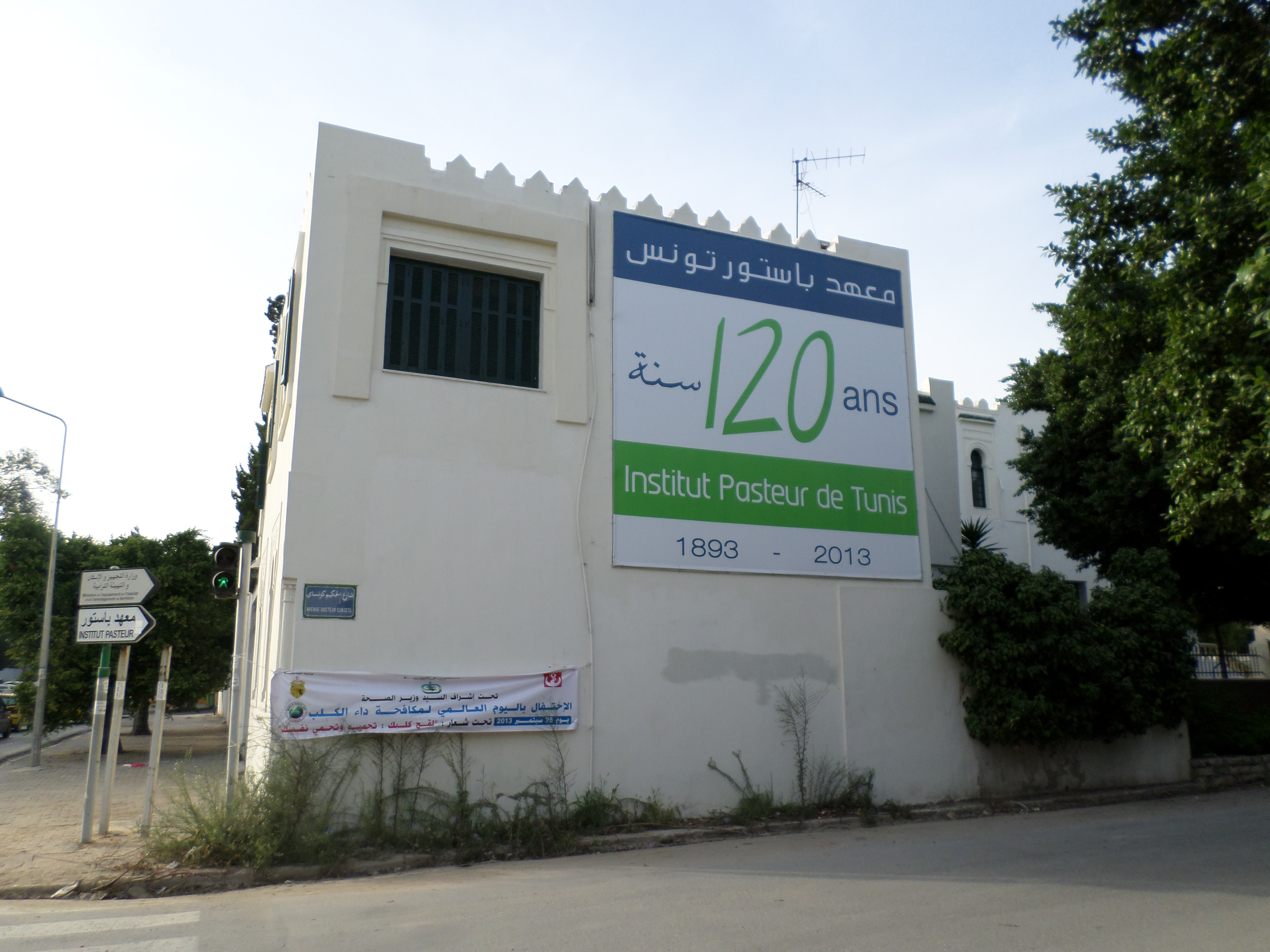
- Facade of the Pasteur Institute on the occasion of its 120th anniversary
- Established: 1893
- Research type: Biomedical research institute
- Director: Hechmi Louzir (since 2007)
- Location: rue des Tanneurs, Tunis, Tunis, Tunisia
- Affiliations: International Network of Pasteur Institutes

The Pasteur Institute of Tunis (Arabic: معهد باستور بتونس), located in Tunis, Tunisia is one of the main research centers of the International Network of Institutes Pasteur.

== History ==
=== Foundation ===
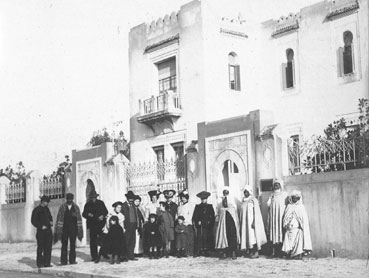
Pasteur Institute of Tunis around 1900

Founded in 1893 by Adrien Loir, it was initially made to be a rabies vaccine center. Located in rue des Tanneurs in Tunis, and now the laboratory currently does research on winemaking and diseases of the vine. A large part of the institutions prestige can be contributed to Charles Nicolle, a bacteriologist and the director between 1902 and 1936, who discovered the cause of typhus ( Rickettsia spp.) during this period of time.

=== Nobel Prize for Charles Nicolle ===
Nicolle is rewarded for his discoveries by the Nobel Prize in Physiology or Medicine in 1928 and the Pasteur Institute is honored on this occasion. Nobel Prize in Physiology or Medicine in 1928 and the Institut Pasteur is honored on this occasion.

=== Attempt to attach to France ===
A few years after the death of Charles Nicolle in 1936, his collaborators compete to take control of the institution. Jean Mons, General Resident of France in Tunisia ended up imposing Lucien Balozet, who was acting director from 1943 to 1949, with the aim of removing from Tunisia an important institution, which must become "dependent on the Pasteur Institute of Paris which agrees to take charge of senior technical management, administration and recruitment of staff of all categories ". Moreover, "the Tunisian government undertakes to pay the annual sum of nine million francs, and the land and buildings currently occupied or under construction will be allocated free of charge to the Pasteur Institute in Paris".Dr. Ahmed Ben Miled then leads a campaign in the Tunisian and French newspapers against this measure.

== Directors ==
Below is a list of directors:

- 1893–1902 : Adrien Loir
- 1902–1936 : Charles Nicolle
- 1936–1943 : Étienne Burnet
- 1943–1949 : Lucien Balozet (intérim)
- 1949–1954 : Paul Durand
- 1954–1960 : Gérard Renoux
- 1960–1962 : Jean Levaditi
- 1963–1988 : Amor Chadli
- 1988–2005 : Koussay Dellagi
- 2005–2007 : Abdeladhim Ben Abdeladhim
- since 2007 : Hechmi Louzir
