= Toxoplasmic chorioretinitis =

Type of eye infection

- Other names: Ocular toxoplasmosis
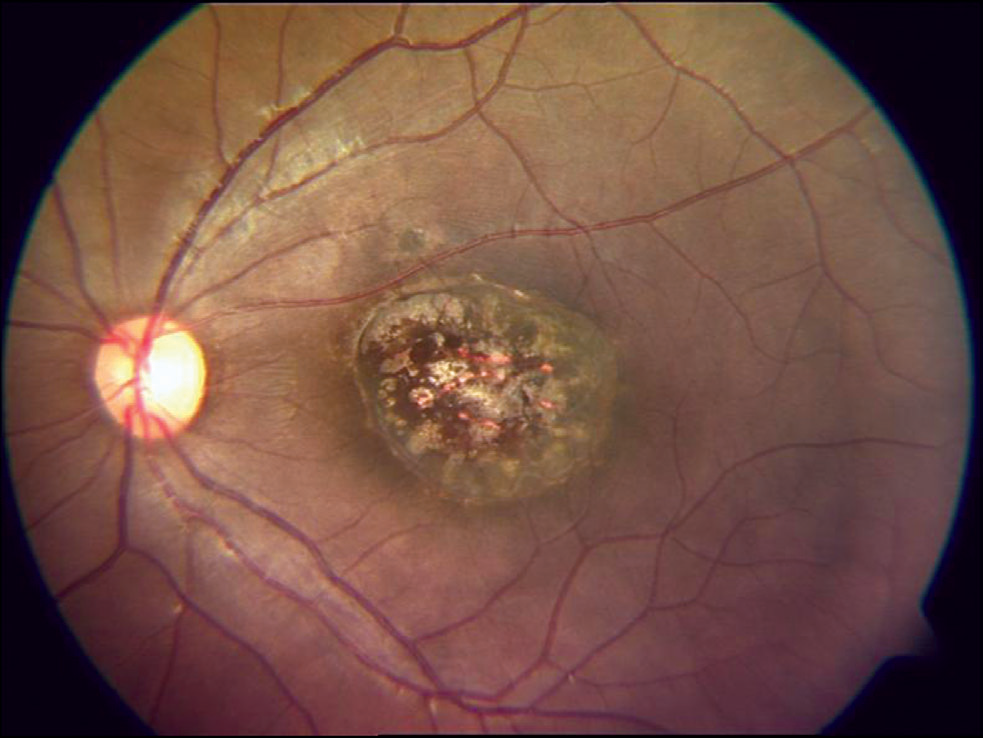
- Chorioretinal scar in the macula of an inactive congenital toxoplasma infection
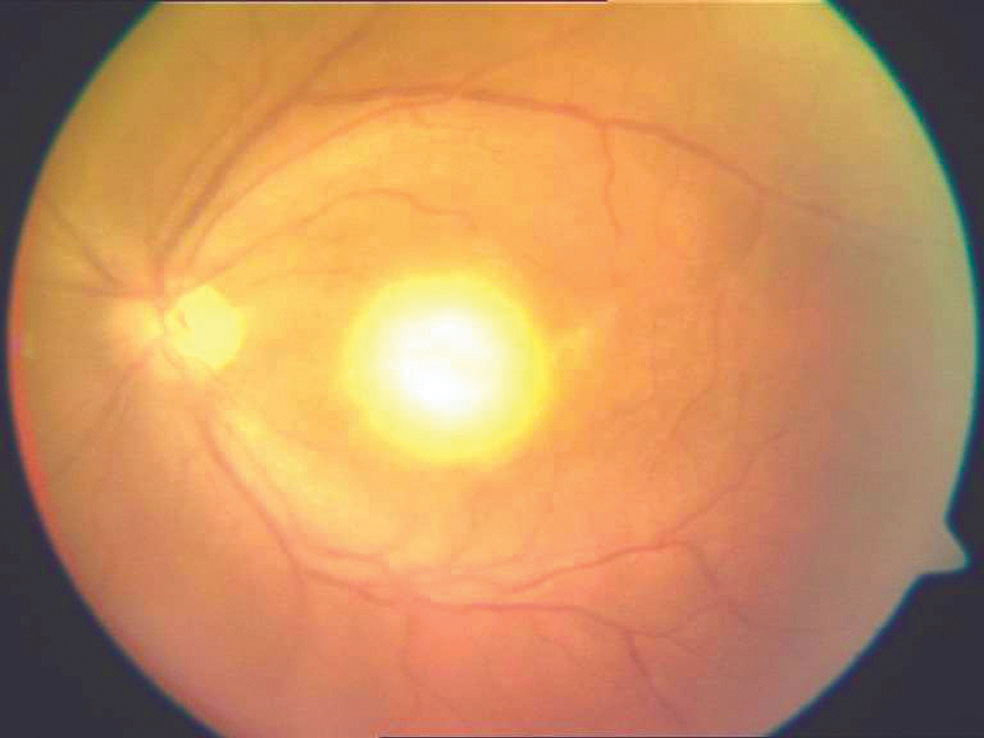
- The typical “headlight-in-fog" appearance caused by vitreous inflammation in toxoplasmosis
- Specialty: Infectious diseases, ophthalmology
- Causes: Toxoplasma gondii

Toxoplasma chorioretinitis, more simply known as ocular toxoplasmosis, is possibly the most common cause of infections in the back of the eye (posterior segment) worldwide. The causitive agent is Toxoplasma gondii, and in the United States, most cases are acquired congenitally. The most common symptom is decreased visual acuity in one eye. Although bilateral disease is more common in congenital cases. The diagnosis is made by examination of the eye, using ophthalmoscopy. Sometimes serologic testing is used to rule out the disease, but due to high rates of false positives, serologies are not diagnostic of toxoplasmic retinitis.

If vision is not compromised, treatment may not be necessary. When vision is affected or threatened, treatment consists of pyrimethamine, sulfadiazine, and folinic acid for 4–6 weeks. Prednisone is sometimes used to decrease inflammation.

== Signs and symptoms ==
A unilateral decrease in visual acuity is the most common symptom of toxoplasmic retinitis.

Under ophthalmic examination, toxoplasmic chorioretinitis classically appears as a focal, white retinitis with overlying moderate inflammation of the vitreous humour. The inflamed vitreous, when it obscures the view of the fundus, is described as having a "headlight-in-fog" appearance. A unifocal area of acute-onset inflammation adjacent to an old chorioretinal scar is virtually pathognomonic for toxoplasmic chorioretinitis. Focal condensation of vitreous and inflammatory cells may be seen overlying the pale yellow or gray-white raised lesion in the posterior pole.

== Pathophysiology ==
Toxoplasma gondii is an intracellular parasite that causes a necrotizing chorioretinitis.

=== Congenital disease ===
Congenital disease occurs due to the acquisition of the organism by a pregnant woman exposed to tissue cysts or oocytes in uncooked meat or substances contaminated with cat feces. Spontaneous abortion may result if the disease is acquired during the first trimester.

Congenital toxoplasmosis may lead to hydrocephalus, seizures, lymphadenopathy, hepatosplenomegaly, rash, and fever. However, retinochoroiditis is the most common manifestation, occurring in 3/4 of cases.

In congenital toxoplasmosis, the disease is bilateral in 65–85% of cases and involves the macula in 58%.

Chronic or recurrent maternal infection during pregnancy is not thought to confer a risk of congenital toxoplasmosis because maternal immunity protects against fetal transmission. In contrast, pregnant women without serologic evidence of prior exposure to Toxoplasma should take sanitary precautions such as having someone else clean and maintain litter boxes and avoiding undercooked meats.

== Diagnosis ==
In most instances, the diagnosis of toxoplasmic retinochoroiditis is made clinically on the basis of the appearance of the characteristic lesion on eye examination.

Seropositivity (positive blood test result) for Toxoplasma is very common and therefore not useful in diagnosis; however, a negative result i.e. absence of antibodies is often used to rule out disease. Others believe that serology is useful to confirm active toxoplasmic retinochoroiditis, not only by showing positivity but by also showing a significant elevation of titers: The mean IgG values were 147.7 ± 25.9 IU/ml for patients with active disease versus 18.3 ± 20.8 IU/ml for normal individuals.

Antibodies against Toxoplasma:

- IgG : appear within the first 2 weeks after infection, typically remain detectable for life, albeit at low levels;and may cross the placenta.
- IgM : rise early during the acute phase of the infection, typically remain detectable for less than 1 year, and do not cross the placenta.
- IgA : Measurement of IgA antibody titers may also be useful in a diagnosis of congenital toxoplasmosis in a fetus or newborn because IgM production is often weak during this period and the presence of IgG antibodies may indicate passive transfer of maternal antibodies in utero. IgA antibodies however usually disappear by 7 months.

In atypical cases, ocular fluid testing to detect parasite DNA by polymerase chain reaction or to determine intraocular production of specific antibody may be helpful for establishing etiology.

Neuroimaging is warranted in AIDS patients presenting with these findings because intracranial toxoplasmic lesions have been reported in up to 29% of these patients who have toxoplasmic chorioretinitis.

== Prevention ==
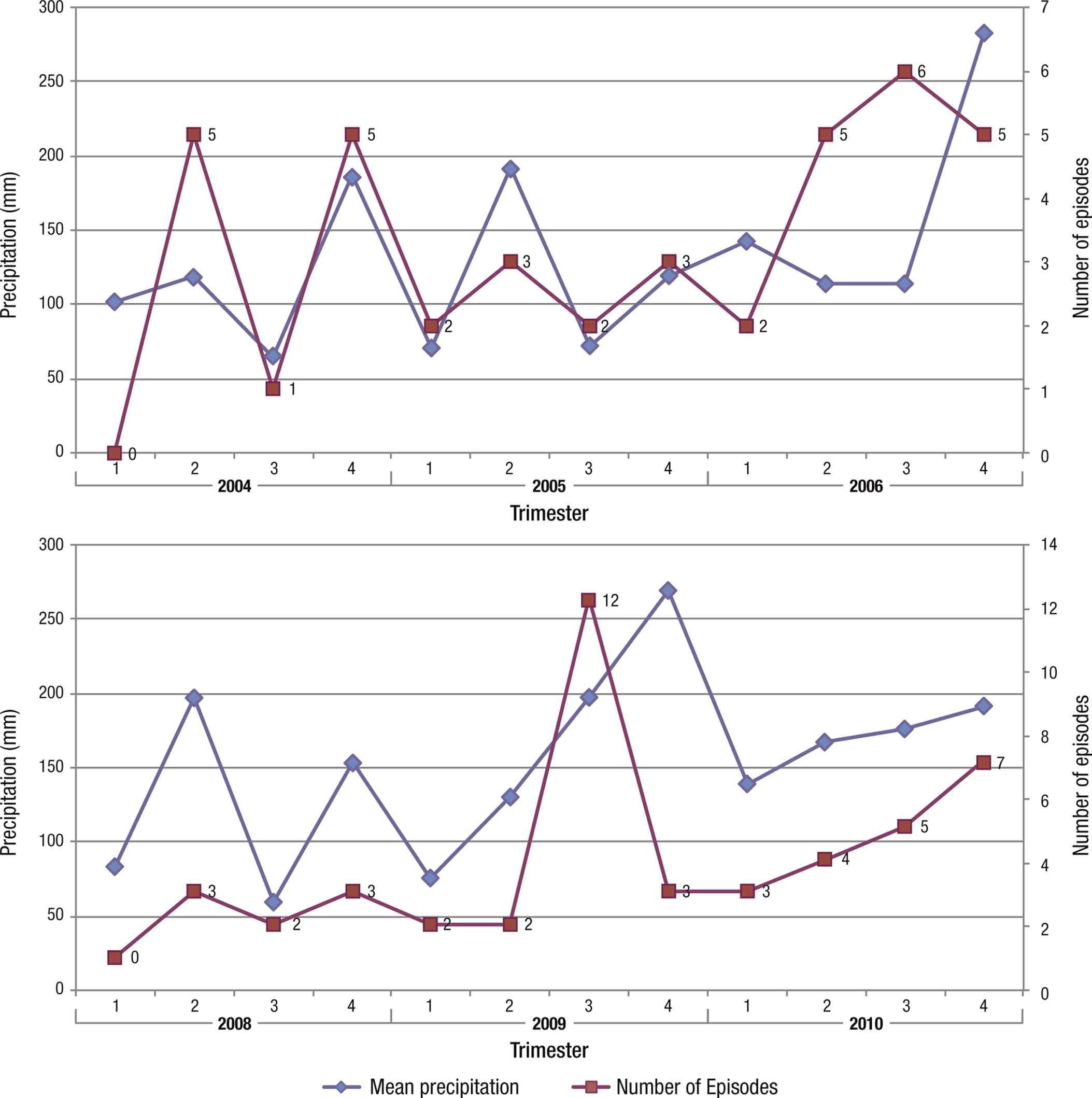
Quarterly precipitation and toxoplasmic reactivation of retinochoroiditis in Argentina

Toxoplasma infection can be prevented in large part by:

- cooking meat to a safe temperature (i.e., one sufficient to kill Toxoplasma)
- peeling or thoroughly washing fruits and vegetables before eating
- cleaning cooking surfaces and utensils after they have contacted raw meat, poultry, seafood, or unwashed fruits or vegetables
- pregnant women avoiding changing cat litter or, if no one else is available to change the cat litter, using gloves, then washing hands thoroughly
- not feeding raw or undercooked meat to cats to prevent acquisition of Toxoplasma

Prolonged and intense rainfall periods are significantly associated with the reactivation of toxoplasmic retinochoroiditis. Changes promoted by this climatic condition concern both the parasite survival in the soil as well as a putative effect on the host immune response due to other comorbidities.

== Treatment ==
Small extramacular lesions (lesions not threatening vision) may be resolved without treatment. Sight-threatening lesions are treated for 4–6 weeks with triple therapy consisting of pyrimethamine, sulfadiazine, and folinic acid. During treatment with pyrimethamine, leukocyte and platelet counts should be monitored weekly. Folinic acid protects against the decrease in platelets and white blood cells induced by pyrimethamine.

Prednisone may be used for 3–6 weeks to reduce macular or optic nerve inflammation and can be started on day 3 of antibiotic therapy. Corticosteroids should not be used without concurrent antibiotic treatment or in immunocompromised patients due to the risk of exacerbation of the disease. Currently, there is no published evidence from randomized controlled trials demonstrating that corticosteroids would be an effective adjunct for treating ocular toxoplasmosis.

Trimethoprim-Sulfamethoxazole has been shown to be equivalent to triple therapy in the treatment of ocular toxoplasmosis and may be better tolerated. Clindamycin and azithromycin can also be considered as alternative therapies. Spiramycin may be used safely without undue risk of teratogenicity and may reduce the rate of transmission to the fetus.

AIDS patients require chronic maintenance treatment.

== See also ==
- Toxoplasmosis
