= Congenital varicella syndrome =

Acquired developmental anomaly syndrome

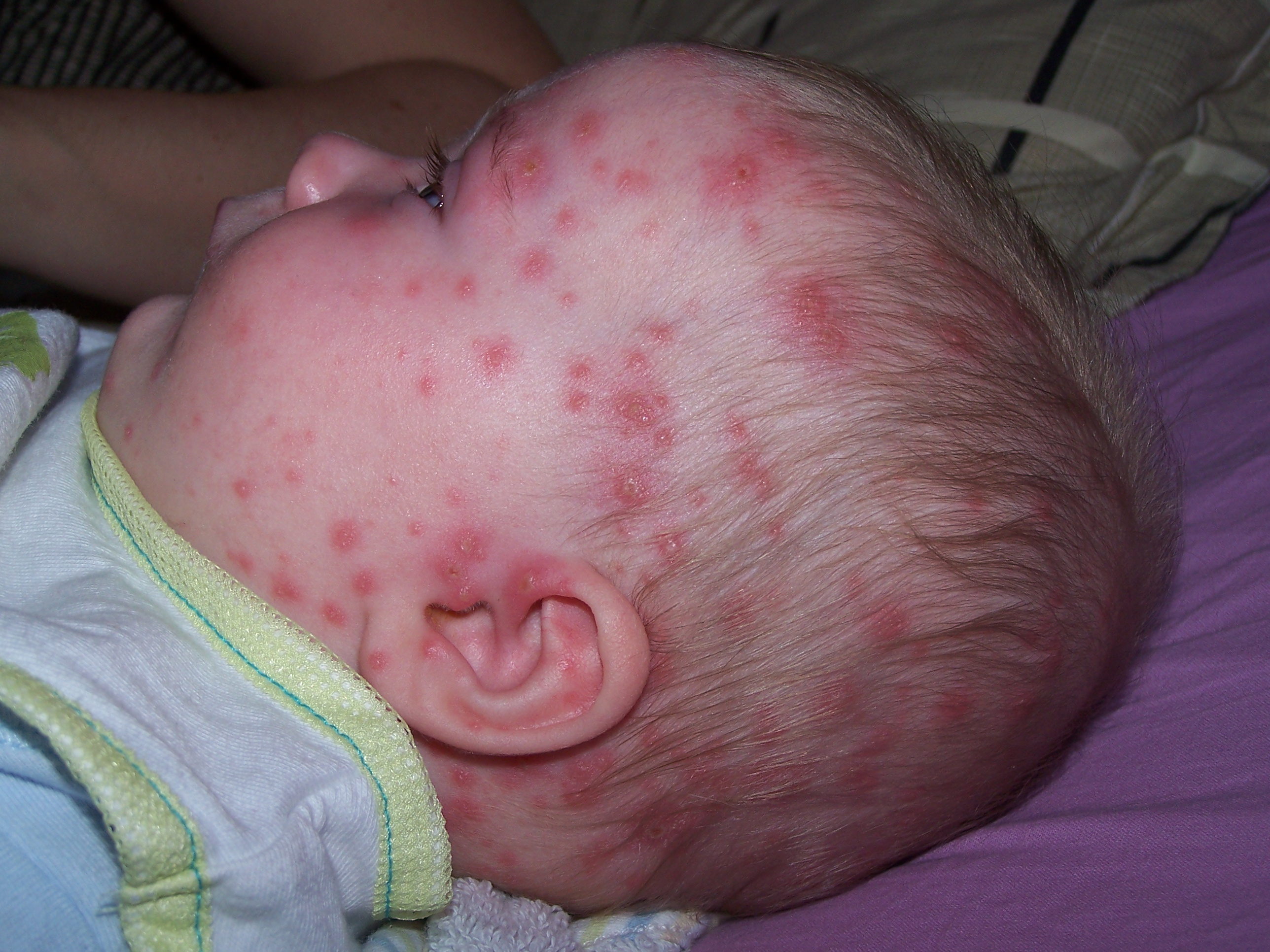
Varicella simplex (Chickenpox) on a child Skull.

Congenital varicella syndrome is a rare disease resulting from Varicella Zoster virus (VZV) infection during the period of gestation. Viremia during the primary infection can result in transplacental transmission of the infection to the developing fetus. An estimated 25% of fetuses get infected with varicella infection when the mother has a varicella infection during the pregnancy, but the risk of developing congenital varicella syndrome is around 2%; therefore, the majority of the outcomes are normal newborns. Patients with primary infection before 20 weeks of gestation are at a higher risk of developing the severe form of infection, affecting the eyes, limbs, skin, and the central nervous system. Diagnosis requires a documented history of primary infection in the mother and serial ultrasound demonstrating features suggestive of congenital varicella syndrome. There is no definitive treatment; termination of pregnancy in fetuses with severe features is recommended. Vaccination to prevent maternal varicella infection and proper counseling to avoid contact with infected people are important for the management options to reduce the incidence of congenital varicella syndrome.

== Historical perspective ==
- In 1947, Lynch reported the first case of congenital varicella syndrome.
- In 1987, Alkalay coined the term fetal varicella syndrome.

== Classification ==
There is no classification for congenital varicella syndrome.

== Pathophysiology ==
=== Pathogenesis ===
- Once a pregnant woman has a primary varicella infection, transplacental transmission of the virus can take place as a result of the viremia affecting the fetus in utero. The resulting clinical manifestations are dependent on the gestational age of the fetus at the time of infection.
- An estimated 25% fetuses are infected with varicella when the mother has a primary infection during the period of gestation, but only less than 2% of fetuses develop congenital varicella syndrome.
- The risk of developing severe manifestations is high when the infection occurs before 20 weeks of gestation, which correlates to the period of gestation when the innervation of the eyes and limbs occurs.
- The risk of developing congenital varicella is (lower) 0.55% between weeks 0 and 12 and is higher (1.4%) between weeks 13 and 20.
- VZV is a neurotrophic virus, and the pathogenesis of the wide variety of manifestations in the fetus is unclear. It is proposed to be related to reactivation of the virus in the fetus, as the fetus cannot mount an immune response against the infection.
- VZV virus is present in the sensory ganglia of the posterior roots of the spinal cord during the latent phase, reactivation of the virus results in the destruction of the nervous tissue resulting in the characteristic cicatricial skin lesions, limb hypoplasia, bladder denervation, and bulbar palsy.
- The presence of diffuse calcifications in the liver, spleen, myocardium and brain support a mechanism of hematogenous spread.

== Epidemiology and demographics ==
Congenital varicella syndrome is a rare disease with over 100 cases reported in the literature.

== Causes ==
Congenital varicella syndrome is caused by Varicella zoster virus (VZV), a human alpha herpes virus.

== Differentiating congenital varicella syndrome from other diseases ==
The most important congenital infections, which can be transmitted vertically from mother to fetus, are the TORCH infections. These infections have overlapping features and hence, must be differentiated from congenital varicella syndrome:

Congenital Infection	Cardiac Findings	Skin Findings	Ocular Findings	Hepatosplenomegaly	Hydrocephalus	Microcephaly	Intracranial calcifications	Hearing deficits
Congenital Varicella Syndrome		-: Cicatrical Skin Lesions; Skin edema	Micropthalmus; Cataracts	✔		✔	✔	
Toxoplasmosis		Petechiae; Purpura; Maculopapular rash	Chorioretinitis	✔	✔	✔	Diffuse intracranial calcifications	
Congenital Syphilis		Petechiae; Purpura; Maculopapular rash	Chorioretinitis; Glaucoma	✔				
Rubella	Patent ductus arteriosus; Pulmonary artery stenosis; Coarctation of the aorta; Myocarditis	Petechiae; Purpura	Chorioretinitis; Cataracts; Glaucoma; Microphthalmia	✔	✔	✔		✔
Cytomegalovirus (CMV)	✔	Petechiae; Purpura	Chorioretinitis	✔		✔	Periventricular calcifications	✔
Herpes simplex virus	Myocarditis	Petechiae; Purpura; Vesicles	Chorioretinitis	✔	✔	✔		✔
Parvovirus B19	Myocarditis	Petechiae; Subcutaneous edema	Chorioretinitis; Cataracts	✔				

== Natural history, prognosis, and complications ==
=== Natural history ===
VZV infection during pregnancy results in a normal newborn birth in majority of the patients, however, in a few patients it can result in congenital varicella syndrome or neonatal varicella or clinical zoster during infancy, the outcomes are dependent on the gestational age of the fetus at the time of infection. Early gestational period infection via the transplacental route can result in congenital varicella syndrome resulting in a miscarriage, abortion or a newborn with features affecting the limbs, eyes, central nervous system, autonomic nervous system and present with features such as low birth weight, cutaneous scarring, limb hypoplasia, microcephaly, cortical atrophy, chorioretinitis and cataracts.

=== Prognosis ===
Severe infection of the fetus can result in an abortion. Infants born with signs of congenital varicella syndrome have poor prognosis and die during the first few months of life. Infants with milder symptoms can have a normal development and good prognosis.

=== Complications ===
Congenital varicella infection can result in the following complications:

- Fetal demise
- Intrauterine growth restriction
- Premature delivery
- Developmental delay

== Diagnosis ==
=== History and symptoms ===
Symptoms of primary infection in mother:

- Primary infection in the mother presents with fever, malaise and a maculopapular skin rash in the beginning which becomes vesicular and crust over with healing.

Symptoms in the neonate

- Skin rash
- Shortened hands and legs with malformed fingers
- Cloudiness of the cornea
- Small head size
- Seizures
- Yellowish discoloration of the eyes and skin

=== Physical examination ===
Physical examination findings suggestive of congenital varicella syndrome include:

	Physical examination findings in congenital varicella syndrome
Skin	Cicatricial lesions( Zig-Zag scarring in dermatomal distribution); Hypopigmentation
Eye	Chorioretinitis; Cataracts; Micropthalmia; Anisocoria
Central Nervous System	Cortical atrophy/porencephaly; Developmental Delay; Microcephaly; Autonomic instability
Musculoskeletal system	Limb hypoplasia; Muscle hypoplasia
Systemic Manifestations	Intrauterine growth retardation

Table adopted from varicella in fetus and newborn

=== Laboratory findings ===
The diagnosis of congenital varicella syndrome is based on a documented history of varicella infection during the pregnancy and the presence of fetal manifestations on ultrasound.

	Key findings for diagnosis of congenital varicella syndrome
History	Positive history for varicella infection during the period of gestation
Fetus / Neonatal Findings	Presence of characteristic cicatrical skin lesions, eye lesions, neurological deficits, limb abnormalities
Proof of Intrauterine Varicella infection	Positive PCR for VZV DNA; Persistence of IgG antibodies at 7 months of age

Table adopted from Herpes simplex and varicella-zoster virus infections during pregnancy: current concepts of prevention, diagnosis and therapy. Part 2: Varicella-zoster virus infections

Diagnosis of primary infection in the mother: In pregnant women, diagnosis of a primary infection requires a combination of clinical manifestations and a series of diagnostic tests. The tests are performed on the samples from the vesicular skin lesions and include the following:

- Culture for VZV, but takes 10 to 12 days to obtain the results.
- Direct fluorescent antigen staining with monoclonal antibodies detects the VZV glycoproteins in the cells.
- PCR for VZV DNA
- Serological tests are not useful for the detection of primary infection in the mother, as it takes time for the IgG antibodies to be produced against VZV.

Prenatal diagnosis

- Sequential ultrasound of the fetus is helpful to establish the presence of varicella infection and assess the severity of intrauterine infection.
- Amniocentesis should be performed 4 weeks after the primary infection in the mother. Positive amniotic fluid PCR for VZV can establish the presence of infection in the amniotic fluid, but does not provide evidence regarding the presence of infection or the severity of infection in the fetus. There is no established evidence to recommend amniocentesis for the diagnosis; it is not performed regularly.
- Presence of VZV IgM antibodies in fetal blood.

=== Imaging studies ===
==== Ultrasound ====
- Sequential ultrasound in women with varicella infection during the period of gestation is the preferred diagnostic investigation to identify anomalies in the fetus. Ultrasound is usually done 4 weeks after the primary infection, as an early ultrasound may fail to detect anomalies. The findings suggestive of congenital varicella syndrome include limb deformities, microcephaly, and hydrops.
- The following is a list of features that can be present in the fetus
  - Cutaneous scars
  - Musculoskeletal deformities such as limb hypoplasia and contractures
  - Intrauterine growth restriction
  - Ventriculomegaly, microcephaly with polymicrogyria, and porencephaly
  - Micropthalmia and congenital cataracts
  - Calcification in the brain, spleen and liver
  - Features of Hydrops fetalis such as skin edema, hepatosplenomegaly
  - Colonic atresia
  - Polyhydramnios
  - Hydroureter and hydronephrosis

==== MRI ====
Prenatal MRI is a useful investigation to assess the extent of CNS involvement and to confirm the findings of ultrasound.

==== Postnatal diagnosis ====
- Postnatal diagnosis of intrauterine varicella infection in the infant is by serological persistence of VZV IgG antibodies at 7 months of life.

== Treatment ==
=== Medical therapy ===
- In patients with established infection early in the period of gestation, regular follow up and ultrasound examination is recommended.
- Termination of pregnancy is indicated in cases with the presence of definitive signs of congenital varicella infection.
- There is insufficient evidence regarding the prevention of transmission and treatment of congenital varicella syndrome with IgG immunoglobulins and acyclovir.
- Varicella infection does not progress postnatally, so treatment with acyclovir is not indicated.
- Isolation is recommended in patients with active skin lesions.

=== Surgical therapy ===
There are no surgical therapies for the treatment of congenital varicella syndrome.

== Prevention ==
=== Primary prevention ===
- Documentation of previous varicella infection and vaccination status in all pregnant women at the first antenatal visit.
- If the pregnant woman has no previous infection or is not vaccinated, VZV IgG antibody testing must be done to determine the maternal immune status.
- In pregnant women with positive IgG, pregnant women are reassured that the IgG antibodies will protect the baby.
- In pregnant women with negative IgG, counseling regarding the risks of varicella infection and education regarding the measures to avoid contact with varicella are recommended, as vaccination against VZV is contraindicated during pregnancy.
- Women who are seronegative should receive two doses of the vaccine during the postpartum period, 4 to 8 weeks apart, with no effect on breastfeeding.
- Women can be vaccinated during the preconception period, but are advised to avoid conceiving for a month after the last dose of the vaccine.

=== Secondary prevention ===
- In pregnant women with exposure to varicella, passive immunization with varicella zoster virus antibodies (VZV IgG) should be administered after 72–96 hours of exposure as post-exposure prophylaxis. Passive immunization is not proven to reduce viremia; therefore, its role in preventing congenital varicella syndrome is not well established. The only indication at present is to prevent maternal complications of varicella in pregnancy.
