= Streptomyces albofaciens =

Scientific classification
- Domain: Bacteria
- Kingdom: Bacillati
- Phylum: Actinomycetota
- Class: Actinomycetia
- Order: Streptomycetales
- Family: Streptomycetaceae
- Genus: Streptomyces
- Species: S. albofaciens

Binomial name
- Streptomyces albofaciens Thirumalachar and Bhatt 1960 (Approved Lists 1980)

Type strain
- 27-A, AS 4.1655, ATCC 23873, ATCC 25184, BCRC 12072, CBS 612.68, CCRC 12072, CGMCC 4.1655, CIP 104425, CMI 137664, DSM 40268, HACC 222, IFO 12833, IMET 43518, ISP 5268, JCM 4342, KCC S-0342, KCCM 40179, KCCS-0342, KCTC 9686, KCTC 9747, LMG 8597, MTCC 6920, NBRC 12833, NCIB 10975, NCIMB 10975, NRRL B-12172, NRRL-ISP 5268, RIA 1189, Thirumalachar 27-A, VKM Ac-724

Species of bacterium

Streptomyces albofaciens is a bacterium species from the genus of Streptomyces which produces oxytetracycline, spiramycin, albopeptin A, albopeptin B and alpomycin.

== See also ==
- List of Streptomyces species
