= Jaxon Buell =

American disabled child (2014–2020)

- Born: August 27, 2014; Orlando, Florida, U.S.
- Died: April 1, 2020 (aged 5); North Carolina, U.S.
- Known for: Living with severe brain malformation; subject of viral social media story

Jaxon Emmett Buell (August 27, 2014 – April 1, 2020) was an American child known for being born missing about 80% of his brain due to microhydranencephaly, a rare birth defect and neurological condition with the traits of both microcephaly (abnormally small brain/skull) and hydranencephaly (where parts of the brain are replaced with fluid). After his first birthday, his parents began posting regular updates on a Facebook page titled Jaxon Strong, which gained widespread attention. They also created a GoFundMe campaign to raise money for medical expenses. By late 2015, the Facebook page had received over 200,000 likes and the campaign had raised more than $100,000.

Jaxon's story received coverage from major outlets including CNN, NBC's Today, Inside Edition, and international media.

Jaxon surpassed doctors' expectations, as they predicted he would not survive more than a few hours after birth. He went on to live over five years. His condition was discovered when his mother, Brittany Lynn Buell, was 17 weeks pregnant. She and her husband, Brandon Jacob Buell, were offered the option of abortion, which they declined due to their Christian beliefs.

At birth, Jaxon had severe cranial malformations and a portion of his skull was missing. The umbilical cord had been wrapped around his neck, and he was born with visible bruising due to birth complications. He spent his first three and a half weeks in the neonatal intensive care unit.

Due to his condition, Jaxon experienced constant seizures and was fed through a feeding tube. Over time, public attention brought both support and criticism. Some questioned the family's fundraising and decision not to terminate the pregnancy, which his father publicly addressed, defending their choices and professing their faith.

The Buells lived in Tavares, Florida for most of Jaxon's life. Jaxon's parents eventually divorced. After that, he lived with his mother. He died on April 1, 2020, in North Carolina, due to complications from his condition. His death gained large coverage from news outlets and social media.
