= Carrimycin =

Macrolide antibiotic

- Carrimycin mixture: R = H, acetyl, or propionyl

Clinical data
- Trade names: Bite
- Other names: Isovalerylspiramycin

Legal status
- Legal status: In general: ℞ (Prescription only)

Identifiers
- DrugBank: DB16476
- UNII: K5E0V85NB9

Carrimycin is a macrolide antibiotic. It was approved by the National Medical Products Administration of China in 2019. It is approved for the treatment of acute tracheal bronchitis caused by Haemophilus influenzae, Streptococcus pneumoniae, and for the treatment of acute sinusitis caused by S. pneumoniae, H. influenzae, Streptococcus pyogenes, Moraxella catarrhalis, and Staphylococcus. Carrimycin is mainly used for the treatment of upper respiratory tract infections.

Carrimycin is a mixture of related chemical compounds, carrimycin I through III, which are each ester derivatives of spiramycin.

Carrimycin has also been investigated for the treatment of COVID-19.
