= MHAC =

MHAC can mean:

- the Mental Health Act Commission, a former NHS special health authority
- Microhydranencephaly, a severe abnormality of brain development
- the Mental Health & Addiction Advocacy Coalition, a non-profit organization in Ohio.
