= NDE1 =

Protein-coding gene in the species Homo sapiens

Identifiers
- Aliases: NDE1, HOM-TES-87, LIS4, MHAC, NDE, NUDE, NUDE1, nudE neurodevelopment protein 1
- External IDs: OMIM: 609449; MGI: 1914453; GeneCards: NDE1

Gene location (Human)
Chr.	Chromosome 16 (human)
Band	16p13.11	Start	15,643,267 bp
Band	16p13.11	End	15,734,691 bp

Gene location (Mouse)
Chr.	Chromosome 16 (mouse)
Band	16|16 A1	Start	13,981,139 bp
Band	16|16 A1	End	14,010,792 bp
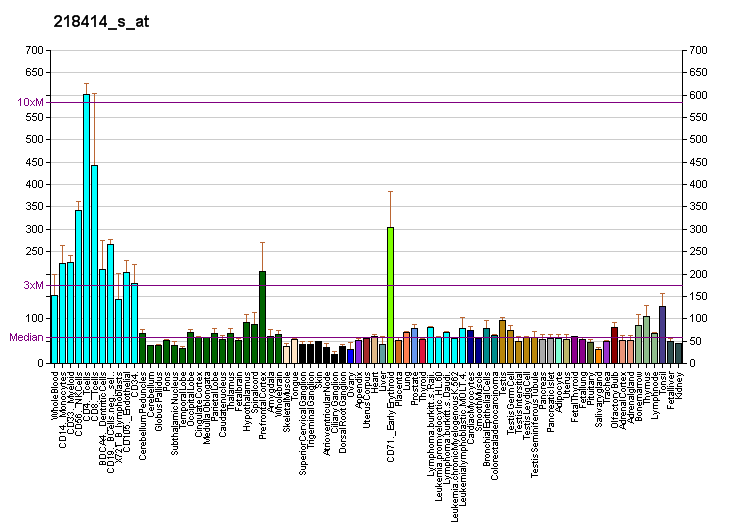
RNA expression pattern
Bgee	Human / Mouse (ortholog); Top expressed in: epithelium of colon; ventricular zone; corpus callosum; sural nerve; blood; monocyte; ganglionic eminence; bone marrow cell; tonsil; C1 segment / Top expressed in: ventricular zone; epiblast; maxillary prominence; primitive streak; mandibular prominence; hand; somite; thymus; abdominal wall; interventricular septum; More reference expression data
BioGPS	More reference expression data
Gene ontology
Molecular function	protein domain specific binding; protein binding; identical protein binding; microtubule binding
Cellular component	cytoplasm; cytosol; centrosome; membrane; spindle; spindle pole centrosome; synapse; chromosome; microtubule organizing center; cleavage furrow; microtubule; chromosome, centromeric region; cytoskeleton; kinetochore; kinesin complex
Biological process	cell differentiation; centrosome duplication; establishment of chromosome localization; neuron migration; nervous system development; cell division; multicellular organism development; G2/M transition of mitotic cell cycle; establishment of mitotic spindle orientation; cerebral cortex development; neuroblast proliferation; cell cycle; forebrain development; microtubule organizing center organization; sister chromatid cohesion; ciliary basal body-plasma membrane docking; microtubule nucleation; chromosome segregation; mitotic centrosome separation; cell migration; vesicle transport along microtubule; centrosome localization; regulation of G2/M transition of mitotic cell cycle
Sources:Amigo / QuickGO
Orthologs
Databases	NCBI: entry; OMA: entry
Species	Human	Mouse
Entrez	54820	67203
Ensembl	ENSG00000072864; ENSG00000275911	ENSMUSG00000022678
UniProt	Q9NXR1	Q9CZA6
RefSeq (mRNA)	NM_001143979; NM_017668	NM_001114085; NM_001285503; NM_001285504; NM_023317
RefSeq (protein)	NP_001137451; NP_060138	NP_001107557; NP_001272432; NP_001272433; NP_075806
Location (UCSC)	Chr 16: 15.64 – 15.73 Mb	Chr 16: 13.98 – 14.01 Mb
PubMed search
- Wikidata
View/Edit Human	View/Edit Mouse

Nuclear distribution protein nudE homolog 1 is a protein that in humans is encoded by the NDE1 gene.

== Clinical significance ==
Mutations in NDE1 can cause severe and often fatal defects in fetal brain development, including lissencephaly and microhydranencephaly.
