= Sabin–Feldman dye test =

Serologic test for diagnosing toxoplasmosis

- Purpose: diagnose for toxoplasmosis.

A Sabin–Feldman dye test is a serologic test to diagnose for toxoplasmosis. Patient serum is treated with Toxoplasma trophozoites and complement, and then incubated. After incubation, methylene blue is added. If anti-Toxo antibodies are present in the serum, the antibody-antigen complex activates complement to lyse the parasite membrane, Toxoplasma trophozoites are not stained (positive result); if there are no antibodies, trophozoites with intact membrane are stained and appear blue under microscope (negative result). The dilution of the test serum at which 50% of the tachyzoites are thin, distorted and colorless is reported as antibody titer of the test serum. The test is highly sensitive and specific with no false positives reported so far.

Drawbacks of this test: 1. Difficulty in maintaining the live tachyzoites. 2. It detects immunoglobulin G(IgG) antibodies, hence cannot differentiate between recent or past infection. 3.False positive for Sarcocystis, Trypanosoma lewisi, Trichomonas vaginalis
