= Hemihydranencephaly =

- Specialty: Neurology

Hemihydranencephaly is a severe cephalic disorder characterized by complete or almost complete absence of one hemisphere of the cerebral cortex with preservation of meninges, basal ganglia, pons, medulla, cerebellum, and falx. It is a special type of hydranencephaly.

It is a very rare disease. As it stands, only 9 cases have been reported. Cognitive and language functions may be largely or totally normal, although motor function deficits in one half of the body are typical.
