= ELQ-300 =

Names
- Preferred IUPAC name 6-Chloro-7-methoxy-2-methyl-3-{4-[4-(trifluoromethoxy)phenoxy]phenyl}quinolin-4(1H)-one

Identifiers
CAS Number	1354745-52-0
3D model (JSmol)	Interactive image
ChEMBL	ChEMBL2431810
ChemSpider	28540481
PubChem CID	67016608
UNII	BRC5YE92RX
CompTox Dashboard (EPA)	DTXSID001045320
- InChI: InChI=1S/C24H17ClF3NO4/c1-13-22(23(30)18-11-19(25)21(31-2)12-20(18)29-13)14-3-5-15(6-4-14)32-16-7-9-17(10-8-16)33-24(26,27)28/h3-12H,1-2H3,(H,29,30) Key: WZDNKHCQIZRDKW-UHFFFAOYSA-N; InChI=1/C24H17ClF3NO4/c1-13-22(23(30)18-11-19(25)21(31-2)12-20(18)29-13)14-3-5-15(6-4-14)32-16-7-9-17(10-8-16)33-24(26,27)28/h3-12H,1-2H3,(H,29,30) Key: WZDNKHCQIZRDKW-UHFFFAOYAI
- SMILES: Cc1c(c(=O)c2cc(c(cc2[nH]1)OC)Cl)c3ccc(cc3)Oc4ccc(cc4)OC(F)(F)F

Properties
Chemical formula	C_{24}H_{17}ClF_{3}NO_{4}
Molar mass	475.85 g·mol^{−1}
- Except where otherwise noted, data are given for materials in their standard state (at 25 °C [77 °F], 100 kPa). Infobox references

ELQ-300 is an experimental antimalarial medication. It is the first entry in a new class of antimalarials known as 4-quinolone-3-diarylethers.

ELQ-300 acts as an inhibitor of the mitochondrial cytochrome bc_{1} complex (complex III in the electron transport chain) - A mechanism shared with some of the most potent fungicides known, the strobilurins. In preclinical studies with mice, ELQ-300 was found to be highly active against Plasmodium falciparum and Plasmodium vivax at all life cycle stages that play a role in the transmission of malaria, and to have good oral bioavailability.

Due to issues with crystallization, ELQ-300 was turned into a prodrug known as ELQ-331. ELQ-331 and two other similar drug candidates are currently in development.
