= Retinitis =

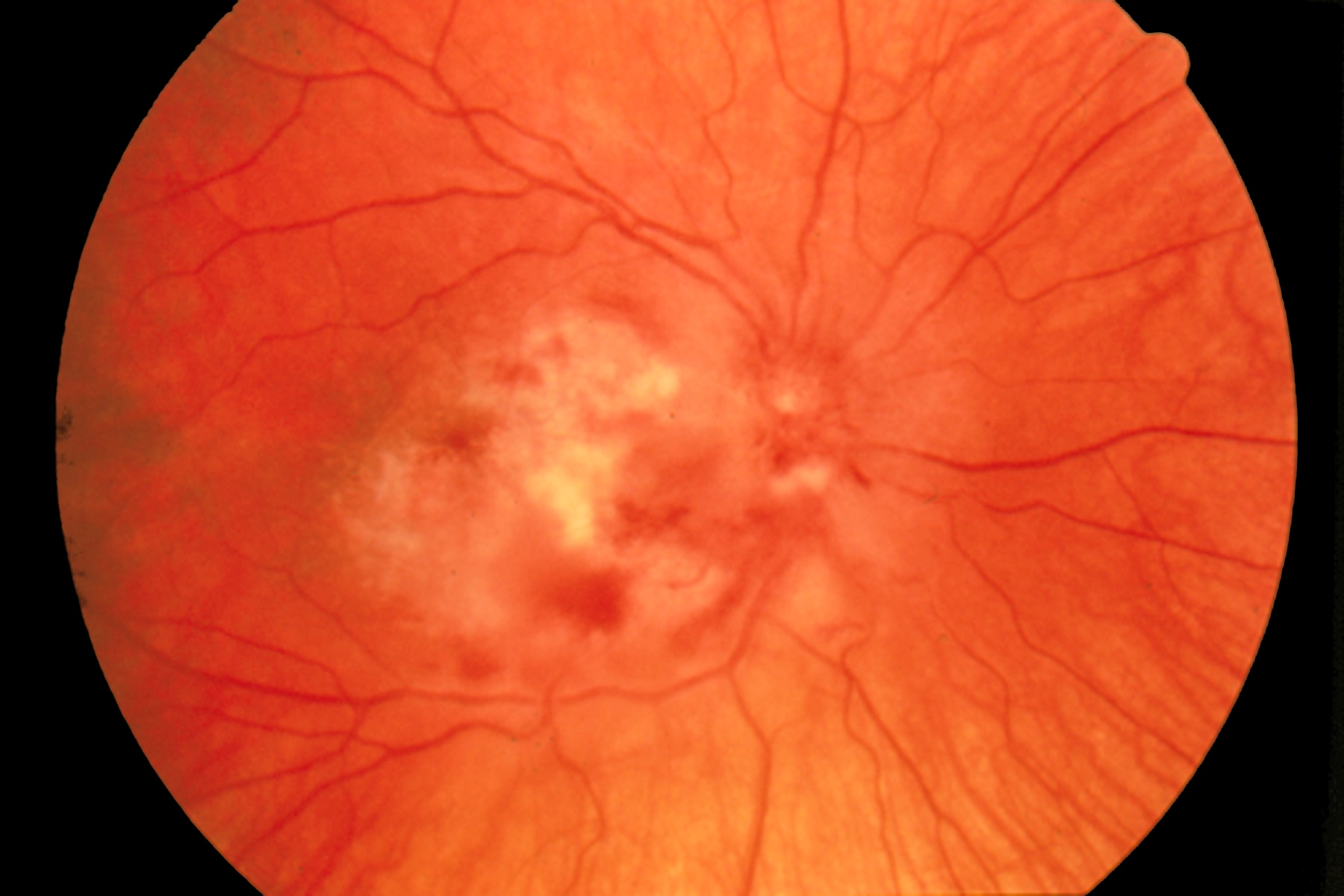
- Retinitis caused by CMV (fundus photograph)
- Specialty: Ophthalmology

Retinitis is inflammation of the retina in the eye, which can permanently damage the retina and lead to blindness. The retina is the eye's "sensing" tissue. Retinitis may be caused by a number of different infectious agents. Its most common form, called retinitis pigmentosa, has a prevalence of one in every 2,500–7,000 people. This condition is one of the leading causes that leads to blindness in patients in the age range of 20–60 years old.

Retinitis may be caused by several infectious agents, including toxoplasmosis, cytomegalovirus and candida. Cytomegalovirus retinitis is an important cause of blindness in AIDS patients. Candida spreading to the retina from the bloodstream usually results in the production of several retinal abscesses.

== Symptoms and signs ==
The first symptom of this disease is usually a slow loss of vision, especially that of night vision, making it harder to drive in the dark. Later signs include loss of peripheral vision, leading to tunnel vision. In some cases, symptoms are experienced in only one of the eyes. Experiencing floaters, flashes, blurred vision and loss of side vision in just one eye may be an early indication of onset of retinitis.

== Diagnosis ==
Although there has been extensive research in the past decades on the disease, there is still no evidence-based therapies for this condition which is often diagnosed at an early age, usually in teenagers or young adults.

To make a specific diagnosis, intraocular fluid samples may be taken and sent for analysis. In some cases, blood or cerebrospinal fluid (CSF) are also tested. Imaging may be done to help make the diagnosis.

== Prevention ==
Research indicates that some supplements, especially vitamin A, lutein, and omega-3 fatty acids, may slow down the progression of the disease and alleviate symptoms temporarily.

== Treatment ==
It is extremely important to see an eye doctor regularly. While supplements mentioned above may help reduce the symptoms, retinitis itself is not curable. Additionally, devices such as low-vision magnifiers can be used to aid vision in patients with despaired vision due to retinitis. Rehabilitation services may also aid the patient so that patients may use their vision in a more effective way. Lastly, it is advisable to wear sunglasses even on gloomy days to protect the eyes from UV radiation.

== Recent research ==
Current research on retinitis includes studying stem cells, medications, gene therapies, and transplants to help treat/cure this condition. One study including patients with retinitis was conducted by using gene therapy.
