= Microhydranencephaly =

Severe abnormality of brain development

Microhydranencephaly (MHAC) is a severe abnormality of brain development characterized by both microcephaly and hydranencephaly. Signs and symptoms may include severe microcephaly, scalp rugae (a series of ridges), and profound intellectual disability. Familial occurrence of the condition is very rare but it has been reported in a few families. It has been suggested that some cases of MHAC are inherited in an autosomal recessive manner via a loss-of-function mutation of the gene NDE1.

== Notable cases ==
- Jaxon Buell was born on August 27, 2014, with 80% of his brain, and most of his skull, missing. He surpassed all doctors' expectations, who did not expect him to live to his second birthday. He died at five years old.
