= Spiramycin =

Chemical compound

Clinical data
- Routes of administration: oral
- ATC code: J01FA02 (WHO) QJ51FA02 (WHO)

Legal status
- Legal status: In general: ℞ (Prescription only)

Identifiers
- IUPAC name: (4R,5S,6R,7R,9R,10R,11E,13E,16R)-10-{[(2R,5S,6R)-5-(dimethylamino)-6-methyltetrahydro-2H-pyran-2-yl]oxy}-9,16-dimethyl-5-methoxy-2-oxo-7-(2-oxoethyl)oxacyclohexadeca-11,13-dien-6-yl 3,6-dideoxy-4-O-(2,6-dideoxy-3-C-methyl-α-L-ribo-hexopyranosyl)-3-(dimethylamino)-α-D-glucopyranoside
- CAS Number: 8025-81-8
- PubChem CID: 5356392
- DrugBank: DB06145
- ChemSpider: 4512090
- UNII: 71ODY0V87H
- KEGG: D05908
- ChEBI: CHEBI:85260
- ChEMBL: ChEMBL1256397
- NIAID ChemDB: 007350
- E number: E710 (antibiotics)
- CompTox Dashboard (EPA): DTXSID6045402
- ECHA InfoCard: 100.029.476

Chemical and physical data
- Formula: C_{43}H_{74}N_{2}O_{14}
- Molar mass: 843.065 g·mol^{−1}
- 3D model (JSmol): Interactive image
- Melting point: 134 to 137 °C (273 to 279 °F)
- Solubility in water: Insoluble in water; Very soluble in acetonitrile and methanol; Almost completely(>99.5) in ethanol. mg/mL (20 °C)
- SMILES: O=CCC4C(OC2OC(C(OC1OC(C)C(O)C(O)(C)C1)C(N(C)C)C2O)C)C(OC)C(O)CC(=O)OC(C)C\C=C\C=C\C(OC3OC(C)C(N(C)C)CC3)C(C)C4
- InChI: InChI=1S/C43H74N2O14/c1-24-21-29(19-20-46)39(59-42-37(49)36(45(9)10)38(27(4)56-42)58-35-23-43(6,51)41(50)28(5)55-35)40(52-11)31(47)22-33(48)53-25(2)15-13-12-14-16-32(24)57-34-18-17-30(44(7)8)26(3)54-34/h12-14,16,20,24-32,34-42,47,49-51H,15,17-19,21-23H2,1-11H3/b13-12+,16-14+; Key:ACTOXUHEUCPTEW-OBURPCBNSA-N

Spiramycin is a macrolide antibiotic and antiparasitic. It is used to treat toxoplasmosis and various other infections of soft tissues.

Although used in Europe, Canada and Mexico, spiramycin is still considered an experimental drug in the United States, but can sometimes be obtained by special permission from the FDA for toxoplasmosis in the first trimester of pregnancy. Spiramycin has been used in Europe since the year 2000 under the trade name "Rovamycine", produced by Rhone-Poulenc Rorer, Sanofi and Famar Lyon, France and Eczacıbaşı İlaç, Turkey. It also goes under the name Rovamycine in Canada (distributed by OdanLaboratories), where it is mostly marketed to dentists for mouth infections. Spiramycin has been studied as a virulence inhibitor in Pseudomonas aeruginosa.

== Medical uses ==
=== Available forms ===
It is available for parenteral and oral administration. Another treatment option (typically used after 16w gestation) are a combination of pyrimethamine and sulfadiazine (given with leucovorin).

== Pharmacology ==
=== Pharmacodynamics ===
The antibiotic action involves inhibition of protein synthesis in the bacterial cell during translocation. Resistance to spiramycin can develop by several mechanisms and its prevalence is to a considerable extent proportional to the frequency of prescription in a given area. The antibacterial spectrum comprises Gram-positive cocci and rods, Gram-negative cocci and also Legionellae, mycoplasmas, chlamydiae, some types of spirochetes, Toxoplasma gondii and Cryptosporidium species. Enterobacteria, pseudomonads and pathogenic moulds are resistant. Its action is mainly bacteriostatic, on highly sensitive strains it exerts a bactericide action. As compared with erythromycin, it is in vitro weight for weight 5 to 20 less effective, an equipotential therapeutic dose is, however, only double. This difference between the effectiveness in vitro and in vivo is explained above all by the great affinity of spiramycin to tissues where it achieves concentrations many times higher than serum levels. An important part is played also by the slow release of the antibiotic from the tissue compartment, the marked action on microbes in sub-inhibition concentrations and the relatively long persisting post-antibiotic effect. Its great advantage is the exceptionally favourable tolerance-gastrointestinal and general.

== Chemistry ==
Spiramycin is a 16-membered ring macrolide.

== History ==
It was isolated in 1954 as a product of Streptomyces ambofaciens by PINNERT-SINDICO. As a preparation for oral administration it has been used since 1955, in 1987 also the parenteral form was introduced into practice.
