= Sulfadiazine =

Sulfa drug

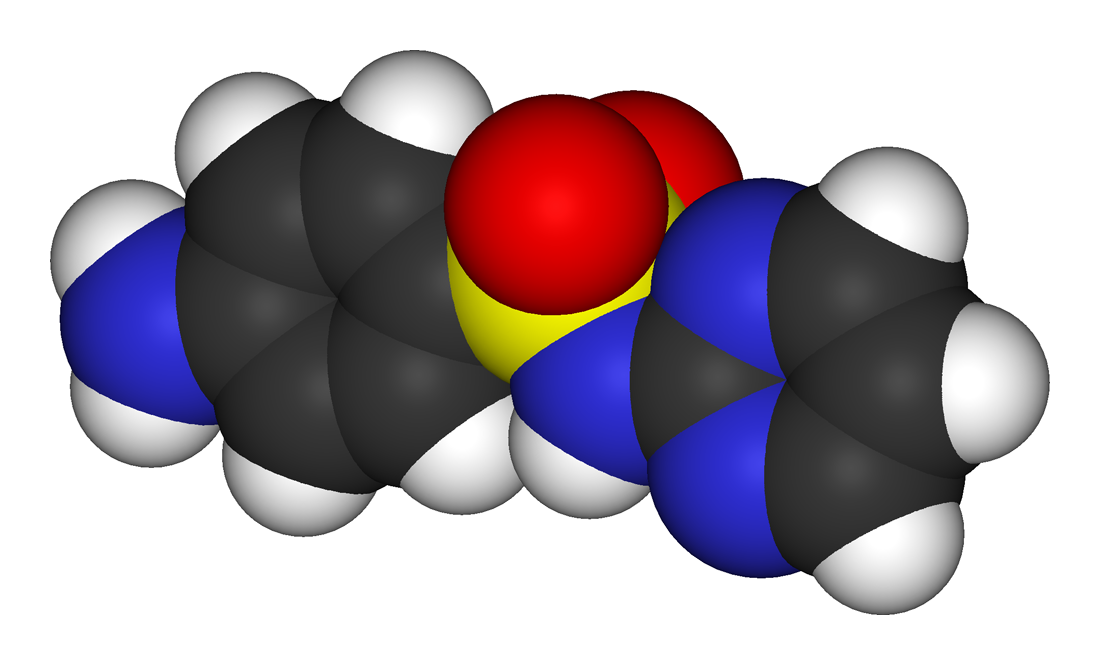

Clinical data
- AHFS/Drugs.com: Monograph
- MedlinePlus: a682130
- Routes of administration: Topical cream, by mouth
- Drug class: Antibiotic (sulfonamide)
- ATC code: J01EC02 (WHO) QJ01EQ10 (WHO)

Legal status
- Legal status: In general: ℞ (Prescription only)

Pharmacokinetic data
- Bioavailability: ?
- Protein binding: 38-48%
- Metabolism: Liver (acetylation)
- Elimination half-life: 7-17 hours
- Excretion: Urine

Identifiers
- IUPAC name: 4-amino-N-(pyrimidin-2-yl)benzenesulfonamide
- CAS Number: 68-35-9 547-32-0 (sodium salt)
- PubChem CID: 5215
- DrugBank: DB00359
- ChemSpider: 5026
- UNII: 0N7609K889
- KEGG: D00587
- ChEMBL: ChEMBL439
- CompTox Dashboard (EPA): DTXSID7044130
- ECHA InfoCard: 100.000.623

Chemical and physical data
- Formula: C_{10}H_{10}N_{4}O_{2}S
- Molar mass: 250.28 g·mol^{−1}
- 3D model (JSmol): Interactive image
- Melting point: 252 to 256 °C (486 to 493 °F)
- SMILES: Nc1ccc(S(=O)(=O)Nc2ncccn2)cc1
- InChI: InChI=1S/C10H10N4O2S/c11-8-2-4-9(5-3-8)17(15,16)14-10-12-6-1-7-13-10/h1-7H,11H2,(H,12,13,14); Key:SEEPANYCNGTZFQ-UHFFFAOYSA-N

Sulfadiazine is an antibiotic. Used together with pyrimethamine, a dihydrofolate reductase inhibitor, it is the treatment of choice for toxoplasmosis, which is caused by a protozoan parasite. It is a second-line treatment for otitis media, prophylaxis of rheumatic fever, chancroid, chlamydia, and infections by Haemophilus influenzae. It is also used as adjunct therapy for chloroquine-resistant malaria and several forms of bacterial meningitis. It is taken by mouth. Sulfadiazine is available in multiple generic tablets of 500 mg. For urinary tract infections, the usual dose is 4 to 6 grams daily in 3 to 6 divided doses.

Common side effects include nausea, diarrhea, headache, fever, rash, depression, and pancreatitis. It should not be used in people who have severe liver problems, kidney problems, or porphyria. If used during pregnancy, it may increase the risk of kernicterus in the baby. While the company that makes it does not recommend use during breastfeeding, use is believed to be safe if the baby is otherwise healthy. It is in the sulfonamide class of medications.

Sulfadiazine was approved for medical use in the United States in 1941. It is on the World Health Organization's List of Essential Medicines. Sulfadiazine is available as a generic medication.

== Medical uses ==
It eliminates bacteria that cause infections by stopping the production of folate inside the bacterial cell, and is commonly used to treat urinary tract infections and burns.

In combination, sulfadiazine and pyrimethamine can be used to treat toxoplasmosis, the disease caused by Toxoplasma gondii.

== Other uses ==
Sulfadiazine is used in plant research for selecting and maintaining genetically manipulated cells.

== Mechanism of action ==
Sulfadiazine works by inhibiting the enzyme dihydropteroate synthetase.

== Side effects ==
Side effects reported for sulfadiazine include nausea, loss of appetite, dizziness, gastrointestinal upset, rash and fever.

== Brand names ==
This drug is sold branded as Lantrisul, Neotrizine, Sulfadiazine, Sulfaloid, Sulfonamides Duplex and Sulfose.

"Triple sulfa" (or trisulfapyrimidines) is a name often given to a combination of sulfadiazine with sulfamerazine and sulfamethazine. This is marketed under brand names such as Sulfa-Triple #2, Terfonyl, Triple Sulfa, Triple Sulfas and Triple Sulfoid.

== See also ==
- Silver sulfadiazine
