= Prenatal care in the United States =

Overview of the prenatal care system in the United States of America

Prenatal care in the United States is a health care preventive care protocol recommended to women to provide regular check-ups that allow obstetricians-gynecologists, family medicine physicians, or midwives to detect, treat and prevent potential health problems throughout pregnancy while promoting healthy lifestyles that benefit both mother and child. Patients are encouraged to attend monthly checkups during the first two trimesters and in the third trimester, gradually increasing to weekly visits. Women who suspect they are pregnant can schedule pregnancy tests prior to 9 weeks of gestation. Once pregnancy is confirmed, an initial appointment is scheduled after 8 weeks of gestation. Subsequent appointments typically include various tests, ranging from blood pressure checks to glucose level assessments, to monitor the health of both the mother and fetus. If not, appropriate treatment will then be provided to prevent any further complications.

Prenatal care in the United States started as a preventive measure against preeclampsia, which included program visits during which medical professionals conducted physical, history, and risk evaluations. Over the last century, prenatal care has shifted focus to low birth weight and other preventive conditions to decrease the rate of infant mortality. Increased use of prenatal care was found to reduce the rates of birth-weight-related mortality and other preventable medical ailments such as post-partum depression and infant injuries.

The United States has socioeconomic disparities that prevent the equal adoption of prenatal care throughout the country. Various levels of prenatal care accessibility can be observed in both developing and developed countries, such as the U.S. Although women can benefit from taking advantage of prenatal care, there exists varying degrees of health care accessibility between different demographics, by ethnicity, race, and income-level, throughout the United States. Education level can also influence the utilization and accessibility of prenatal care. Nearly one-fifth of women in the United States do not access prenatal care during the first trimester of pregnancy. The prenatal health care system, along with personal attitudes, all contribute to the utilization and accessibility of prenatal care. Suggested steps to improve prenatal care in the United States include the implementation of community-based healthcare programs and an increase in the number of those insured.

== Background ==
Prenatal care is health care provided to pregnant women as a type of preventive care to provide regular check-ups that allow obstetricians-gynecologists, family medicine physicians, or midwives to detect, treat and prevent potential health problems throughout the pregnancy while promoting healthy lifestyles that benefit both mother and child. Health professionals instruct mothers on prenatal nutrition, the benefits of breastfeeding, lifestyle changes, injury and illness prevention, and methods to monitor potentially dangerous health conditions. Medical professionals also inform the mother on the birthing process and basic skills for taking care of a newborn.

During visits, physicians determine the due date, family and medical history, conduct a physical exam and pelvic exam, and run various blood work. Physicians also conduct ultrasounds to monitor the baby's health periodically throughout the pregnancy. Ultrasounds are used to measure fetal growth, heartbeats, movement, and the identification of physically identifiable abnormalities. Regular check-ups allow physicians to assess changes to the mothers' blood pressure, weight, uterus size, protein supplies from urine samples, and various diseases such as diabetes through screening tests. Prenatal care serves as a tool to inform mothers on common concerns, and on methods to take care of themselves (amount of rest needed, the proper nutritional diet, etc.).The WHO recommends that pregnant women receive at least eight antenatal visits to spot and treat problems and give immunizations. Although antenatal care is important to improve the health of both mother and baby, many women do not receive the recommended eight visits.

== Schedule ==
A prenatal care schedule is recommended to consist of:

- Monthly visits to a health care professional for weeks 1 through 28 -(up to month 7)
- Visits twice a month from 28 to 36 weeks of pregnancy -(the 7th and 8th month)
- Weekly after week 36 (delivery at week 38–40)-(After the 8th month)

More frequent visits are warranted for women older than 35 or in case of a high risk pregnancy, with the number and types of extra controls depending on individual risk factors. On the other hand, it has been suggested that 8 to 11 visits in total can be sufficient for women considered at low risk of adverse perinatal outcomes.

Example of prenatal care schedule in the United States for low-risk pregnancies
	Screening and monitoring	Education and intervention	Vaccination and other prophylaxis
Pre-conception check up	Height and weight to calculate BMI; Blood pressure; Medical history; Abdominal and pelvic examination; Rubella testing; Varicella testing; Domestic violence; Depression; Blood lipids (cholesterol and HDL); Pap test	Preterm labor education and prevention; Substance use; Weight and nutrition and pregnancy; Domestic violence and pregnancy; List of medications, dietary supplements, herbal supplements; Accurate recording of menstrual dates; Counseling in case of potential vaginal birth after Caesarean	Tdap or tetanus booster if needed; rubella and/or varicella vaccination if needed; Hepatitis B vaccine; Folic acid supplementation
Visit 1, 3–6 weeks	Height and weight to calculate BMI; Blood pressure; Medical history; Abdominal and pelvic examination; Rubella testing; Varicella testing; Domestic violence; Depression; Complete blood count; ABO/rh blood typing; Syphilis test; Gonorrhea and chlamydia for women at high risk for STDs; Urine culture; HIV testing; Lead poisoning test if necessary; Hepatitis B; Hepatitis C if high risk	Preterm labor education and prevention; Exercise in pregnancy; Nutrition; Follow-up of modifiable risk factors in pregnancy; Nausea and vomiting in pregnancy; Warning signs; Course of care; Physiology of pregnancy; Counseling in case of potential vaginal birth after Caesarean; Discussion of diagnosis of fetal aneuploidy	Tdap or tetanus booster if needed; Nutritional supplements if needed; Influenza vaccination if necessary; Varicella vaccination if necessary; Tetanus and pertussis vaccination if necessary
Visit 2, 10–13 weeks	Weight; Blood pressure; Fetal heart monitoring; Diagnosis of fetal aneuploidy if warranted	Preterm labor education and prevention; Fetal growth; Review of labs from visit 1; Breastfeeding; Nausea and vomiting in pregnancy; Physiology of pregnancy; Follow-up of modifiable risk factors in pregnancy	
Visit 3, 16 weeks	Weight; Blood pressure; Fetal heart monitoring; Fundal height; Depression; Diagnosis of fetal aneuploidy if warranted; Obstetric ultrasonography (optional)	Preterm labor education and prevention; Follow-up of modifiable risk factors; Physiology of pregnancy; Second-trimester growth; Quickening	Progesterone for prevention of preterm birth if necessary
Visit 4, 18–21 weeks	Weight; Blood pressure; Fetal heart monitoring; Fundal height	Preterm labor education and prevention; Follow-up of modifiable risk factors; Parent education program; Family issues; Length of stay; Gestational diabetes; Rho(D) immune globulin	
Visit 5, 24–28 weeks	Weight; Blood pressure; Fetal heart monitoring; Fundal height; Preterm labor risk; Depression; Gestational diabetes screening; Domestic abuse; Rh antibody status if needed; Hepatitis B surface antigen if needed; Gonorrhea and chlamydia for women at high risk for STDs	Preterm labor education and prevention; Psychosocial risk factors in pregnancy; Follow-up modifiable risk factors; Work; Physiology of pregnancy; Preregistration; Fetal growth; Awareness of fetal movement	Rho(D) immune globulin if necessary
Visit 6, 29–32 weeks	Weight; Blood pressure; Fetal heart monitoring; Fundal height	Preterm labor education and prevention; Follow-up of modifiable risk factors; Travel; Contraception; Sexuality; Pediatric care; Episiotomy; Labor & delivery issues; pregnancy-induced hypertension; Counseling in case of potential vaginal birth after Caesarean	
Visit 7, 36 weeks	Weight; Blood pressure; Fetal heart monitoring; Fundal height; Cervix exam; Confirming fetal position; Culture for group B streptococcus	Follow-up of modifiable risk factors; Postpartum care; Management of late pregnancy symptoms; Contraception; When to call the provider; Discussion of postpartum depression	
Visit 8–11, 38–41 weeks	Weight; Blood pressure; Fetal heart monitoring; Fundal height; Cervix exam	Follow-up of modifiable risk factors; Postpartum vaccinations; Infant CPR; Post-term management; Labor and delivery update	

=== Pre-conception counseling ===
Pre-conception counseling in the United States is recommended to include:

- Height and weight to calculate BMI
- Blood pressure
- Medical history
- Abdominal and pelvic examination
- Rubella screening
- Varicella screening
- Domestic violence screening
- Depression screening
- Testing for gonorrhea and chlamydia for women at high risk for STDs

== Vaccination ==
Vaccine	Type	Recommendation by CDC
Hepatitis A vaccine	Inactivated	Yes, if indicated
Hepatitis B vaccine	Inactivated	Yes, if indicated
HPV vaccine	Inactivated	No (under study)
Influenza vaccine	Inactivated	Yes
Influenza vaccine	Live attenuated	No
MMR vaccine	Live attenuated	No
Meningococcal vaccine	Polysaccharide or conjugate	Yes, if indicated
Tdap	Toxoid or inactivated	Yes, during each pregnancy between 27 and 36 weeks of gestation
TD vaccine	Toxoid	Yes, if indicated (Tdap preferred)
Varicella vaccine	Live attenuated	No
Anthrax vaccine	Subunit	No, unless the risk of exposure is significant
BCG vaccine	Live attenuated	No
Japanese encephalitis vaccine	Inactivated	Insufficient data for recommendation
Rabies vaccine	Inactivated	No, unless post-exposure
Typhoid vaccine	Live attenuated	Insufficient data for recommendation
Smallpox vaccine	Live attenuated	No, unless post-exposure
Yellow fever vaccine	Live attenuated	No, unless the risk of exposure is significant
RSV vaccine (Abrysvo)	Protein subunit	Yes

=== Influenza vaccination ===
It is recommended that all pregnant women receive influenza vaccination during flu season. Increased infectious susceptibility in pregnancy may increase the likelihood of influenza complications such as pneumonia, particularly in the third trimester. In addition, the fever, tachycardia, and hypoxemia caused by influenza may be harmful to the developing fetus.

Vaccination with inactivated trivalent influenza vaccine is cost-saving relative to providing supportive care alone in the pregnant population, but a 2009 review concluded that there was insufficient evidence to recommend routine use of it during the first trimester of pregnancy. Inactivated vaccines for influenza are considered safe at any gestational age. On the other hand, live attenuated influenza vaccines such as the nasal spray vaccine are not recommended in pregnancy. Preservative-free vaccines are available in case of hypersensitivity to eggs or to vaccine components.

=== Rubella ===
Rubella is contagious viral disease, with symptoms like mild measles. Screening for rubella susceptibility by history of vaccination or by serology is recommended in the US for all women of childbearing age at their first preconception counseling visit to reduce incidence of congenital rubella syndrome (CRS). Due to concerns about possible teratogenicity, use of MMR vaccine or measles vaccine is not recommended during pregnancy. Susceptible pregnant women should be vaccinated as soon as possible in the postpartum period.

=== Varicella ===
Varicella is a herpes virus that causes chicken pox and shingles. Administration of the varicella vaccine during pregnancy is contraindicated. Immunity status to varicella should be elicited during the preconception counseling visit.

=== Tetanus and pertussis ===
If an urgent need for tetanus protection occurs during pregnancy, Td vaccine should be administered. If no urgent need arises and the woman has previously received tetanus vaccine, Td vaccination should be delayed until the postpartum period. All postpartum women who have not received Td or Tdap vaccine in the last two years are recommended to receive Tdap before discharge after delivery. It is recommended for pregnant women who have never received the tetanus vaccine (i.e., have never received DTP, DTaP or DT as a child or Td or TT as an adult) to receive a series of three Td vaccinations starting during pregnancy to ensure protection against maternal and neonatal tetanus. In such cases, administration of Tdap is recommended after 20 weeks' gestation, and in earlier pregnancy, a single dose of Tdap can be substituted for one dose of Td, and then the series completed with Td.

=== RSV (respiratory syncytial virus) ===
RSV, or respiratory syncytial virus, is a common virus that frequently infects infants, children, and older adults. It typically affects the respiratory tract, or the nose, throat, and lungs. Minor infections can cause cough and congestion, but serious infections, especially in infants, can cause severe difficulty breathing and result in hospitalization or death. It is the most common cause of hospitalization in children under one year of age.

The RSV vaccine from Pfizer, Abrysvo, is recommended by the CDC and ACOG for pregnant women in order to protect their newborn from infection. This is a subunit protein vaccine, so that the mother's immune system will develop antibodies in response to seeing a protein that is found in RSV. The mother's antibodies will pass to the fetus through the umbilical cord, meaning the infant will be protected at birth from RSV. RSV infections surge in the fall and winter, so women that are 32–36 weeks pregnant between the months of September and January should receive an RSV vaccine. Babies are protected from their mother's antibodies for as long as they circulate in their body, lasting around six months after birth.

== Attitudes towards prenatal care ==
Studies have found no differences between the attitudes of women from different ethnic or social backgrounds regarding prenatal care. Browner and Press found no significant differences between various demographics in women's attitudes toward their prenatal care practices. Women, regardless of demographics, are similarly affected by certain health behaviors, stressful events, environmental stress, social support, mental health, and prior obstetric history. There was no influence of ethnicity, marital status, transportation availability, rural vs. urban residence, distance of residence from clinic, or prior prenatal care on the timing of women's first access to prenatal care. A woman's first prenatal visit was associated with self-referral to care, more prenatal care advocates, and fewer children. The greater number of children means that mothers have lower means, and a higher time and physical burden, preventing them from attending prenatal care appointments regularly.

=== Positive influences ===
Social networks of family, friends, and surrounding persons play a significant role in influencing an individual's utilization of prenatal services. Networks of those underutilizing prenatal care and acting against medical recommendations tend to be larger and of higher density in comparison to women who utilize care appropriately. This suggests that populations affected by underutilizing prenatal care are larger than populations utilizing care appropriately. Social network members share opinions, reach a consensus, and act to communicate and reinforce their suggestions and expectations, all of which are valued higher than those of healthcare professionals. First-time mothers, and a supporting number of family members and friends, their social support, play a significant role in a woman's decision to seek early prenatal care and subsequent prenatal care services. The size of their "social support" encouraging prenatal care participation increases the chance of early prenatal care utilization during the first trimester. When an increased length of time passes, women who have yet to have had an encouraging "social support" to seek early prenatal care might attend prenatal care on their own will; however, this is usually after the first trimester has passed.

=== Negative influences ===
Attitudes influence the decisions to accept or not accept specific prenatal care recommendations based on their knowledge gained from personal experiences and outside information from social networks. One reason women do not follow doctors' advice is due to the perception that the information given is false. Women often hear and experience situations in which health professionals were wrong. Subsequent recommendations were then weighted to determine truth evaluability. Many women who are distrustful of biomedicine will decline certain prenatal tests, citing their bodily knowledge as more trustworthy than their doctor's high-tech interpretations. Some minority women may opt to avoid the distress and discomfort of medical care and refuse prenatal care entirely.

Another well-intentioned attempt for home monitoring can negatively influence a decision to go into the hospital. Fetal dopplers are used in the clinic or hospital to hear a fetus's heart rate. When available for commercial purchase, they have been reported as an adverse event by the FDA for false reassurance. Mothers can mistake their own heart beat or the placenta's blood flow for the baby's heart rate. This can result in the mother not going into the hospital for other concerning symptoms, which can impact the health outcome of both mother and baby.

Having already borne healthy children increases the probability that mothers will not follow clinical recommendations, attributing positive prenatal situations to their past experiences. Personal health could be self-defined with the recognition of their symptoms and determining if one needs to seek treatment from medical professionals.

Some mothers are quite uncomfortable with this lack of clearly communicated information and are consequently hesitant to pursue prenatal testing and counseling that health professionals would consider to recommend.

== Disparities in accessibility ==
Although attitudes towards prenatal care can be assessed similarly between different socioeconomic backgrounds, there still exists a discrepancy between prenatal care services and knowledge about available prenatal care resources throughout the nation. Analysis of trends depicting the use of prenatal care services constantly shows the problem of underutilization, especially in disadvantaged populations within the United States. This discrepancy in the degree to which disadvantaged and advantaged populations use prenatal care services can be explained by social factors such as the limited availability of providers, inefficiency, poorly organized health care delivery systems, and inadequate insurance coverage. Rates of mothers accessing prenatal care late or no prenatal have decreased; although, since 2003, rates have plateaued.

=== Low-socioeconomic areas ===
Populations in urban inner-city settings have an increased risk of substandard prenatal care. Low-socioeconomic areas experience higher rates of neonatal mortality, caused in large part by low birth weights, than do women of higher income. This statistic has the chance to decrease with an increase in the number of women entering prenatal care programs. It is more likely that women of higher incomes seek prenatal care in comparison to lower income women. Blacks, Hispanics, single women, women with lower levels of education (less than 12 years), teenagers under 18, women over 40, women with three or more previous births, and women with fewer socioeconomic resources have a significantly lower opportunity for satisfactory health care services.

=== Minorities' access ===
Studies have shown a significantly higher risk for blacks and Hispanics of receiving inadequate prenatal care. African-American expectant mothers are 2.8 times as likely as non-Hispanic white mothers to begin their prenatal care in the third trimester, or to receive no prenatal care during the entirety of the pregnancy. Similarly, Hispanic expectant mothers are 2.5 times as likely as non-Hispanic white mothers to begin their prenatal care in the third trimester, or to receive no prenatal care at all. Latina women and African American women were likely to visit different types of health care professionals; Latina women are more likely to go see an obstetrician while African American women are more likely to see a practitioner. Minorities' perspective on their prenatal care experience was partly based on the interaction with their medical provider and whether they too were of minority background and of the same gender due to cultural familiarity in how physicians interact with their patients.

==== Latina paradox ====
A particularly consistent finding regarding the health of the Latino population is that Latina women, despite their many social and economic disadvantages (e.g., lower socioeconomic status, lower levels of education, less use of prenatal care, less access to health insurance), give birth to significantly fewer low birth weight infants and lose fewer babies to any and all causes during infancy in comparison to non-Hispanic white women. This phenomenon is part of what is known as the “Latina paradox” or “Epidemiologic paradox”, which is a mortality advantage within the Latino population. This cultural advantage begins to fade when Latina women acculturate into mainstream American culture; thus, more acculturated Latina women experience a higher infant mortality rate and give birth to more low-birth-weight infants. Exploring the factors that bring about the Latina paradox at the individual and community levels may help identify new opportunities for policy interventions to optimize prenatal outcomes in U.S. born Latinas and other non-Hispanic white ethnic groups. There is no definitive explanation for what leads to a mortality advantage. Behavioral factors such as drug use, alcohol consumption, and tobacco use may serve as a contribution to the paradox, since Latina women smoke less, consume less alcohol, and use drugs less when pregnant compared to their non-Hispanic white counterparts. Cultural factors may be relevant to the Latina paradox since foreign-born Latina women have lower rates of low-birth weight babies than U.S. born Latina women and non-Hispanic white women. Alternatively, community factors such as the acculturation of the community and the values of the community may also contribute to the paradox.

=== Contributing factors ===
==== Unintended pregnancy ====
Unintended pregnancy precludes pre-conception counseling, and pre-conception care, and delays initiation of prenatal care. In unintended pregnancies, prenatal care is initiate later, and is less adequate. This adversely affects health of woman and of child, and the woman is less prepared for parenthood. Delay from unintended pregnancy is in addition to that from other risk factors for delay.

The United States rate of unintended pregnancies is higher than the world average, and much higher than that in other industrialized nations. Almost half (49%) of U.S. pregnancies are unintended, more than 3 million unintended pregnancies per year. The rate of unintended pregnancy is even higher among the poor. In 1990, about 44% of births were unintended at the time of conception; among poor women, almost 60% of births were due to unintended pregnancies.

==== Health insurance ====
Of those women who become pregnant every year in the United States 13 percent are uninsured, resulting in severely limited access to prenatal care. According to Children's Defense Fund's website, "Almost one in every four pregnant Black women and more than one in three pregnant Latina women are uninsured, compared with one in nearly seven pregnant White women. Without coverage, Black and Latina mothers are less likely to access or afford prenatal care." Currently, pregnancy is considered a "pre-existing condition," making it much harder for uninsured pregnant women to actually be able to afford private health insurance. In 1990, 1995, and 1998, the expansion of MediCal increased the use of prenatal care and reduced ethnic differences in those who utilized health services.

Data has shown that those with access to Medicaid account for 58 percent of women who underutilize prenatal care; those with access to another type of insurance coverage account for 11 percent of women who underutilize prenatal care.

==== Formal education ====
Women with fewer than 12 years of education are at high risk of underutilizing or lacking access to adequate prenatal care services. Oftentimes, Black and Hispanic pregnant women have fewer years of formal education, which sparks a domino effect of consequences related to prenatal care. A lack of formal education results in less knowledge about pregnancy, appropriate prenatal healthcare as a whole, fewer job opportunities, and a lower level of income throughout their adult life.

== Consequences from lack of prenatal care ==
Without timely, thorough, and appropriate prenatal care, disadvantaged populations and those who do not utilize prenatal health services face higher risks of encountering consequences during prenatal, childbirth and post-partum experiences. Mothers who receive late or no prenatal care are more likely to give birth to babies with health ailments. Some health problems can be prevented by increasing both proper application and access to adequate prenatal care. Nearly one-fifth of women in the United States do not seek prenatal care during their first trimester.

=== Delivery complications ===
Without proper prenatal care services, there is an increase in complication rates such as:

- Intrauterine growth restriction: the poor growth of babies while in the mother's womb
- Preeclampsia: hypertension occurs during pregnancy
- Preterm premature rupture of membranes: the rupture of the amnionic sac and chorion more than an hour before the start of labor
- Gestational diabetes: Women who have not previously suffered from diabetes before pregnancy exhibit high blood glucose levels during pregnancy due to the mother's lack of ability to secrete insulin.
- Placenta previa: the placenta is attached to the uterine wall close to or covering the cervix
- Preterm birth: babies are born less than 37 weeks of their full gestational age. Premature newborns can suffer from immature lungs, that is associated with respiratory complications.

Every year in the United States, 875,000 women experience one or more pregnancy complications, and 467,201 babies are born prematurely.

=== Low birth weight ===
Every year in the United States, 27,864 newborns are born with low birth weight. Newborns of mothers who do not utilize prenatal care are three times more likely to have a low birth weight and five times more likely to die in comparison to newborns whose mothers regularly attended prenatal care check-ups. Sesia et al. found a positive association with the number of prenatal care visits and birth weight. Low birth weight are associated with prematurity and contributes to rates of infant mortality.

=== Congenital malformations ===
Every year in the United States, 154,051 children are born with birth defects. Congenital malformations may be caused by:

- Genetic disorders
- Intrauterine environment
- Errors of morphogenesis, the biological process that causes an organism to develop its shape.
- Chromosomal abnormality

Some commonly known congenital malformations are:

- Cleft palate: a fissure or opening in the lip
- Heart defects
- Down syndrome: the presence of all or a part of an extra 21st chromosome.

Prenatal care deficits and postnatal environments work together in a complex manner to influence the outcomes of congenital disorders.

=== Infant mortality ===
In 2000, the United States ranked 27th among industrialized countries for its relatively high infant mortality rate. Data from 2003 shows that the infant mortality rate was 6.9 deaths per 1,000 live births. Every year in the United States, 27,864 infants die before their first birthday. The United States' mortality rate is one of the highest amongst other developed countries. It is associated with maternal health, socioeconomic conditions, and public health practices. Inadequate use of prenatal care is a strong predictor of low infant birth weight, prematurity, and infant mortality.

== Improving prenatal care ==
Although disadvantaged populations continue to face decreased access to high-quality prenatal care, there are suggested plans of action to decrease the extent of healthcare inequalities. The Healthy People 2010 Program, a nationwide set of goals for health promotion and disease prevention, set a goal that by 2010, 90% of mothers, both of high and low incomes, would be able to access adequate care early. The 2020 Healthy People goal for prenatal care is that 77.6% of pregnant females receive early and adequate prenatal care; 70% received such care in 2007.

=== Preventing unintended pregnancy ===
Preventing unintended pregnancies would have many desirable health, social, and financial results, including increasing the proportion of pregnancies with adequate and timely access to prenatal care. Programs to help reduce unintended pregnancy include increased education about and access to contraceptives and improved sex education.

=== Connection between physicians and patients ===
For many patients, it is difficult to develop a long-standing and trusting relationship with healthcare providers. Regardless of socioeconomic background, women will incorporate beneficial lifestyle changes that are easily incorporated into their daily lives. Data from Browner et al. found that pregnant women do not regard prenatal recommendations to be authoritative simply because they were issued by clinical professionals, with tend to follow recommendations by their discretion. Using prenatal diagnostic tests may reinforce the importance of following the doctor's orders. Medical staff should aim to establish effective lines of communication with health care providers to ensure an increased awareness of women's health while establishing trust with their patients. If patients cannot be matched with healthcare providers culturally, then they should at least be able to visit a physician who is trained specifically to deal with cultural differences. This awareness and sensitivity can come in many forms, such as a familiarity with a foreign language, an understanding of how a specific ethnicity views mothers, or knowing how family networks play into the mothers’ decision-making process. All of these options have the potential to improve doctor-patient relationships, and the establishment of such relationships can be implemented in medical training in the US both in medical school settings and on-site training programs.

It has been suggested that physicians and other health care providers screen their patients for both abuse and sexually transmitted diseases to ensure their overall well-being. They should also aid them in getting the proper treatment, health, social, and legal services if a problem exists.

=== Increase insurance ===
The lack of adequate health insurance, specifically health insurance in the United States, can contribute to the limitations and underutilization experienced by women. Hessolhas two studies demonstrating that insurance status is a strong determinant of the utilization of prenatal care; as eligibility of health insurance increased, the use of prenatal care increased and ethnic differences decreased. Although, while private health insurance is one method to which women can access or afford prenatal care, private health insurance has not always proven to necessarily be helpful or reassuring.

Sesia et al. found no significant differences suggesting that a mandatory managed care program for prenatal care improved nor impeded access to prenatal care services. A study done on women utilizing prenatal care services found that resources provided by an HMO program, such as prenatal education classes, recommendations for diet, exercise, weight gain, and rest, pregnancy books, and magazines subscriptions, were not viewed by women as being helpful.

=== Community outreach programs ===
Community outreach programs would train members of the minority population in basic health education; then these community health workers would help to facilitate connections between expectant mothers and local healthcare establishments. The community health workers could even continue their relationship throughout the duration of the pregnancy, serving as a patient liaison during the various tests, appointments, and conversations. Communities of low-income should employ community residents to encourage and support the utilization of health care services.

Those with outreach contact were more likely to serve disadvantaged populations such as those reported with obstetric risks, younger than 19 years old, and less likely to have a significant partner. Targeting this population through community outreach programs that take on community projects can have a positive effect of rates of women accessing and utilizing prenatal care services available.

Suggestions of supporting teen health centers have been made to provide health care services. Resources from this study strongly suggests that prenatal care delivered in a community-base setting is a more efficient and cheaper method for providing positive health outcomes; however, the missions of community-based care program are different. In relation to teenagers or adolescent medicine, a focused community program may lead to an increase in contraceptive use and a decrease in the rate of subsequent pregnancies.

== See also ==
- Pregnancy and prenatal care in U.S. prisons
- Education in the United States
