= Reproductive coercion =

Behaviors that interfere with reproductive rights

Reproductive coercion, also called coerced reproduction, reproductive control or reproductive abuse, is a collection of behaviors that interfere with decision-making related to reproductive health. These behaviors are often perpetrated by a current, former, or hopeful intimate or romantic partner, but they can also be perpetrated by parents or in-laws, or by policies of institutions or government. Coercive behaviors infringe on individuals' reproductive rights and reduce their reproductive autonomy.

Reproductive coercion can include pregnancy coercion, birth control sabotage, and controlling the outcome of a pregnancy.

Reproductive coercion and intimate partner violence are strongly correlated; however, reproductive coercion can occur in relationships in which physical and sexual violence are not reported. Reproductive coercion and unintended pregnancy are strongly associated, and this association is stronger in individuals who have experienced intimate partner violence. While research remains fragmentary, women in abusive relationships are at higher risk of reproductive coercion and unintended pregnancies.

Reproductive coercion is considered a serious public health issue. Negative outcomes include poor mental health, unintended pregnancy, unwanted abortion, and sexually transmitted diseases. Unwanted pregnancy has negative effects on families and children. There are certain disparities regarding who faces reproductive coercion at higher rates.

== Forms ==
=== Pregnancy coercion ===
Pregnancy coercion includes (but may not be limited to) any behaviors intended to coerce or pressure a partner to become or not become pregnant. This also includes or to coercing or pressuring a partner to impregnate them. Pregnancy coercion involves various tactics, including verbal threats related to impregnation, coerced sex, interference with or refusal to use male-controlled contraception (i.e., condoms, withdrawal), interference with or pressure not to use or to use female controlled contraception (i.e., hormonal methods), monitoring menstrual cycles or gynecological visits, pressure for or against sterilization, monitoring of ovulation, or other medical related methods. Threatened or completed physical violence may also be perpetrated against a partner to coerce them to become pregnant or coerce a partner to impregnate them.

=== Birth control sabotage ===
Birth control sabotage involves tampering with contraception or interfering with the use of contraception. Birth control sabotage includes removing a condom after agreeing to wear one (also called stealthing), damaging a condom, removing or lying about the use of contraception (including vaginal rings, intrauterine devices (IUDs), and contraceptive patches), or throwing away or lying about the consumption of oral contraceptive pills. Other methods of birth control sabotage include preventing a partner from obtaining or refilling contraceptive prescriptions, refusing to wear a condom, stating that a condom is being worn when one is not, not withdrawing after agreeing to do so, not informing a partner after ceasing the use of female-controlled contraception or removing contraceptive devices, and not telling a partner if a condom broke or fell off.

Gender and sexual power dynamics and coercion associated with sexual power dynamics are both linked to condom nonuse. Even women with high sexually transmitted infection knowledge are more likely to use condoms inconsistently than women with low STI knowledge when there is a high level of fear for abuse.

=== Controlling the outcome of a pregnancy ===
Controlling the outcome of a pregnancy is an attempt to influence a partner to either terminate a pregnancy or to continue a pregnancy. Another term for this behavior is abortion coercion. One review found that pressure from male partners for their female partner to have an abortion was relatively rare; ranging from 0.1 percent to 4 percent. Only one study in the review reported on prevalence of pressure to continue a pregnancy, which found that ~8% of male partners had pressured their female partner not to have an abortion. All data was self-reported by the male partner. A Guttmacher Institute policy analysis states that both forcing a woman to terminate a pregnancy she wants and forcing a woman to continue a pregnancy she does not want violates the basic human right of reproductive health.

== Prevalence ==
=== United States ===
The US Centers for Disease Control and Prevention's survey on domestic violence includes questions regarding control of reproductive health, specifically pregnancy pressure and birth control sabotage. The 2011 study found that approximately 8.6% (or an estimated 10.3 million) of women in the United States reported ever having an intimate partner who tried to get them pregnant without their consent, or refused to use a condom. Out of that 10.3 million, 4.8% reported having had an intimate partner who tried to get them pregnant unconsensually and 6.7% reported having had an intimate partner who refused to wear a condom.

Approximately 10.4% (or an estimated 11.7 million) of men in the United States reported ever having an intimate partner who tried to get pregnant unconsensually or tried to stop them from using birth control, with 8.7% having had an intimate partner who tried to get pregnant when they did not want to or tried to stop them from using birth control and 3.8% having had an intimate partner who refused to wear a condom.

In a sample of urban women aged 18–44, 16% reported experiencing reproductive coercion. In a family planning clinic setting in California, 13% of patients reported experiencing reproductive coercion in October 2018. Among California girls aged 14–19 seeking school-based health services, 12.4% reported experiencing reproductive coercion. Among women aged 16–29 seeking family planning in California, 19.1% reported experiencing pregnancy coercion in their lifetime. A reported 15.0% of women (aged 16-29) in California seeking family planning experienced birth control sabotage.

In a sample of college-aged women in the northeastern United States, 8% reported experiencing reproductive coercion, 3.9% reported experiencing birth control sabotage, and 6.8% reported experiencing pregnancy coercion in their lifetime.

In a Texas sample, 1% of non-pregnant women aged 16–40 reported experiencing pregnancy coercion in their lifetime.

Among Pennsylvania family planning clinic patients, reproductive coercion was reported at 5% in October 2018.

In a sample of adolescents (aged 14–20) in Boston, 20% had been coerced into having sex without a condom.

Among women seeking an abortion in the United States, between 0.1% and 2.0% are coerced to have an abortion by an intimate partner. Furthermore, one study of males (aged 18-35) who had ever had sex found that 4.1% had attempted to compel a partner to have an abortion and 8.0% attempted to prevent a partner from having an abortion.

When compared to non-abused girls of the same age, teen girls in abusive relationships are more likely (3.5 times) to end up with an unplanned pregnancy. They are also half as likely to use condoms consistently when compared to non-abused girls, and teenage boys perpetrating this dating violence are also less likely to use condoms. Teenage mothers are nearly twice as likely to have a repeat pregnancy within 2 years if they experienced abuse within three months after delivery. Abused teenage girls (26%) reported that their boyfriends were purposely trying to get them pregnant.

=== Other countries ===
In Bangladesh, 10% of married women experiencing intimate partner violence reported that their male partner disagreed with them about using contraception. Additionally, 10.4% of women who did not report intimate partner violence reported that their male partner disagreed with them about using contraception.

Among women seeking abortions in Northern China, 2.1% reported that they were being forced to have an abortion by their partner.

Among women in Côte d'Ivoire over the age of 18 with a male partner, lifetime prevalence rates of reproductive coercion perpetrated by an in-law of 5.5% and 6.0% have been reported. Lifetime prevalence of reproductive coercion among women in Côte d'Ivoire over the age of 18 perpetrated by a male partner is 18.5%. Reproductive coercion by in-laws was reported by 15.9% of women who were maltreated by their in-laws, versus 2.8% who were not maltreated. Additionally, reproductive coercion by in-laws was reported by 16.3% of women who experienced physical violence by their in-laws, versus 5.9% who did not report violence.

Among women who had abortions in Italy, 2% of those who did not experience intimate partner violence, 7% who experienced psychological violence, and 13% who experienced physical or sexual violence stated that they become pregnant because their partner wanted them to be pregnant. Furthermore, 4.5% of those who did not experience intimate partner violence, 3.6% who experienced psychological violence, and 21.7% who experienced physical or sexual violence stated they had an abortion because their partner wanted a child but they did not.

Among married women aged 15–49 in Jordan, 13% reported that a parent or in-law tried to stop them from using contraception, including their mother-in-law (36%), mother (27%), or sister-in-law (11%). Furthermore, 11% reported that their husband refused to use contraception or tried to stop them from using contraception, and 89% reported their husband had expressed disapproval of contraception. In total, 20% of ever-married Jordanian women report that their husband or someone else has interfered with their attempts to prevent pregnancy.

In Nigeria, coercion by husband was more commonly a reason for IUD removal in younger women (74.2%) than older women (25.8%), and in less educated women (46.7%) than more educated women (33.3%).

In Uganda, a study conducted during the COVID-19 pandemic showed the rates at which sexual violence victims reported experiencing reproductive coercion. The study reported that 17.8% of participants experienced at least one form of reproductive coercion. More specifically, 13.3% felt they were coerced into pregnancy, 8.9% were threatened abandonment for lack of conception, and 6.7% experienced mistreatment due to lack of conception.

In Pakistan, a cross-sectional study showed that women who reported severe psychological, physical, or sexual violence were likely to report that their husband did not support the use of contraceptive methods.

A study conducted in Queensland, Australia reported that women who experience reproductive coercion were likely to report experiences of domestic violence, mental health struggles, report a separated relationship status, and seek prenatal care at a later stage of pregnancy.

== Consequences of reproductive coercion ==
=== Mental health effects ===
Women who report reproductive coercion were significantly more likely to experience probable PTSD.

Black women who experience reproductive coercion are more likely to report PTSD (47.1%) and depression (69%) than women who do not experience the same coercion.

A study conducted in rural Côte d'Ivoire showed that women (25%) who experienced some form of RC from in-laws reported PTSD symptoms.

A study of Ivorian women showed that women who experienced RC from in-laws were significantly more likely (2.3 times) to report PTSD symptoms. The same study showed that these same women were more likely (2.6 times) to report PTSD symptoms if the RC was done by a male partner.

In a study in Australia, women who reported mental health issues were more likely to report reoccurence of mental health issues along with RC than women who reported no experience of RC.

== Disparities in reproductive coercion ==
=== Age ===
Younger women report coercion from a partner being the reason for IUD removal (74.2%) at a higher rate than older women (25.8%).

Women who report reproductive coercion were most likely to be between the ages of 25-29 years old.

Women above 30 years old age were most likely to report experiencing both domestic violence and reproductive coercion.

=== Education ===
Women with only primary and secondary education reported coercion from a partner being the reason for IUD removal (46.7%) more often than women with a tertiary level education (33.3%).

=== Clinic setting ===
Women who visited rural clinics were more likely to report birth control coercion (26%) than women who visited urban clinics.

=== Household dynamic ===
Although not statistically significant, women who lived with in-laws in the house reported experiencing a higher rate (24%) of reproductive interference than women who did not (18%).

=== Family size ===
In a sample of women who reported sexual or physical violence, having greater than five children was shown to protect against facing reproductive interference.

=== Number of pregnancies ===
Regarding RC from in-laws, women who had experienced zero or 1-3 pregnancies were more likely to report experiencing this coercion.

=== Literacy ===
Women who were more literate (9.5%) were more likely to report RC from in-laws than illiterate women (5.3%).

=== Ethnicity ===
Guere women reported reproductive coercion from in-laws at a higher rate than non-Guere women.

Aboriginal and Torres Strait Islander women who reported domestic violence were more like to report RC experiences (19.6%) than women who did not report the samde violence (4.4%).

CALD (culturally and linguistically diverse) women who reported violent experiences were more likely to report RC (25.9%) than CALD women who did not report violence.

=== Religion ===
When looking at Christian, Muslim, and Traditional women, women of traditional faith were more likely to report reproductive coercion from in-laws.

== Clinical practice and unintended pregnancy prevention ==
The American College of Obstetricians and Gynecologists recommends that physicians should screen patients for reproductive coercion periodically, including at annual examinations, during prenatal and postpartum care, and at new patient visits. According to the American College of Obstetricians and Gynecologists and Futures Without Violence recommendations, providers should assess for reproductive coercion as part of routine family planning care and before discussing contraceptive options.

Suggested screening questions in health settings for assessing potential reproductive coercion include:

- Has a current or former partner not let you use birth control, destroyed your birth control, or refused to wear a condom?
- Has your partner ever tried to get you pregnant when you didn't want to be?
- Has your partner ever forced you to have an abortion or caused you to have a miscarriage?
- Does your partner support your decision about when or if you want to become pregnant?
- Do you and your partner agree on what you should do about your pregnancy?

Family planning clinicians can use strategies to help prevent adverse reproductive health outcomes among women who experience reproductive coercion. Strategies include educating patients on the reproductive health impacts of reproductive coercion, counseling on harm reduction strategies, preventing unintended pregnancies by offering discrete, effective birth control methods that may not be detectable by a partner (such as IUDs, emergency contraception, contraceptive implants, or contraceptive injections), and assessing their patient's safety prior to notifying partners about sexually transmitted infections. Interventions that provide awareness of reproductive coercion and provide harm reduction strategies to address reproductive coercion have been found to reduce pregnancy coercion by 71% among women experiencing intimate partner violence.

Emergency contraception can be used after sex without contraception in order to prevent an unwanted pregnancy. In the United States, levonorgestrel (LNG) Plan B One Step and other generics (the morning after pill or emergency contraception) can be acquired by persons of any age. When taken within 72 hours of sex without contraception, Plan B and generics can help prevent an unwanted pregnancy. Other options for emergency contraception in the United States include ulipristal acetate (available with a prescription) taken within five days of sex without contraception, and the insertion of a copper IUD within five days of sex without contraception.

== Documented cases and public accounts ==
Reproductive coercion has been documented in different social, cultural and legal contexts. Reported practices include contraceptive sabotage, pregnancy pressure, interference with decisions to continue or terminate a pregnancy, and the use of threats or deception to control another person's reproductive choices. These behaviours have been reported in intimate relationships as well as in institutional and state-controlled reproductive health programmes.

=== Reproductive coercion in intimate relationships ===
Olivia Nervo and Matthew Pringle (United Kingdom, 2026)

Australian electronic music artist and songwriter Olivia Nervo, known professionally as Liv Nervo and as one half of the electronic music duo Nervo (DJs), publicly discussed her experience of alleged reproductive coercion involving her former partner, New Zealand businessman Matthew Pringle.

According to Nervo, she discovered while six months pregnant that Pringle had maintained a long-term relationship with another woman in New Zealand and was expecting a child with her. Nervo has stated that she had not been aware of the circumstances of his other relationship when she made the decision to have a child with him. She subsequently described the experience as reproductive coercion and began campaigning for greater legal recognition of the issue in England and Wales.

The dispute subsequently became the subject of family court proceedings in England. Nervo sought a fact-finding hearing concerning allegations of reproductive coercion and controlling behaviour. The court did not grant the requested hearing to determine those allegations. A judge nevertheless found that Pringle's dishonest conduct constituted emotional domestic abuse and controlling behaviour. The Court of Appeal subsequently considered a dispute concerning the legal costs of the proceedings in *Pringle v Nervo* [2026] EWCA Civ 266.

Nervo's experience has also been discussed in the context of broader proposals to recognize reproductive coercion as a distinct form of abuse within family court proceedings. Her public campaign has drawn attention to the difficulties faced by individuals seeking recognition of reproductive abuse when the conduct does not involve conventional forms of physical violence.

An anonymous survivor's account (United States, 2021)

In March 2021, *The Washington Post* published an account of a woman who described experiencing reproductive coercion within an intimate relationship. The woman, who requested anonymity, reported that her partner had engaged in unprotected sex despite her intention to use contraception, resulting in an unintended pregnancy. She subsequently experienced pressure and verbal abuse from her partner when considering her pregnancy options.

The report discussed how reproductive coercion can occur without physical violence and may involve contraceptive sabotage, pregnancy pressure, interference with abortion decisions, and deception concerning fertility or contraception. The article also included commentary from researchers who have studied reproductive coercion as a form of intimate partner abuse.

=== Forced abortion and state-imposed reproductive coercion ===
Fei Mei Cheng v. Attorney General (United States, 2010)

In Cheng v. Attorney General, the United States Court of Appeals for the Third Circuit examined the case of Fei Mei Cheng, a Chinese national who experienced coercion by local family-planning officials in China's Fujian Province.

According to the court's account, Cheng became pregnant while she was below the minimum marriage age imposed by local regulations. Officials repeatedly pressured her to terminate the pregnancy and threatened economic sanctions, the confiscation of family property and the possible removal of her child. Cheng refused to undergo an abortion and subsequently gave birth.

Following her refusal to comply with the authorities' demands, officials imposed further sanctions on her family and pressured her to undergo a sterilization procedure. She ultimately agreed to the insertion of an intrauterine device (IUD) under circumstances involving threats and pressure. The court accepted the credibility of her account and found that the Board of Immigration Appeals had erred in its assessment of her persecution claim. It granted her petition for review and remanded the case for further proceedings.

The case illustrates the use of government authority and population-control policies to interfere with pregnancy decisions and reproductive autonomy.

Forced abortion administered by a former West Point cadet (United States, 2022–2026)

In 2026, the Associated Press reported on the criminal case of Caleb Suh, a former United States Military Academy at West Point cadet who pleaded guilty to assaulting his then-girlfriend by secretly administering abortion medication against her wishes.

According to prosecutors, Suh obtained abortion medication while impersonating his girlfriend, secretly drugged her with Xanax and administered the medication in March 2022. The woman subsequently experienced bleeding and required hospital treatment. The incident resulted in the termination of her pregnancy.

The case was reported as an example of reproductive violence involving the deliberate termination of another person's pregnancy without their knowledge or consent. The woman later filed a civil lawsuit seeking damages.

=== Forced and coerced sterilization ===
Relf v. Weinberger (United States, 1973–1974)

The case of Mary Alice and Minnie Lee Relf, two African American sisters aged 12 and 14, became a prominent example of involuntary sterilization in the United States.

In June 1973, the sisters underwent surgical sterilization in Montgomery, Alabama, through a federally funded family-planning programme. Their mother, who was unable to read or write, had been led to believe that she was signing a document authorizing contraceptive injections for her daughters. Instead, she had marked a surgical consent form authorizing their sterilization. Neither of the girls had been adequately informed about the procedure or its permanent consequences.

The subsequent lawsuit, *Relf v. Weinberger*, challenged the federal government's regulations concerning sterilization procedures funded through public programmes. In March 1974, the United States District Court for the District of Columbia addressed the issue of involuntary sterilization and the requirements for valid consent. The case became an important part of the broader legal and public debate surrounding sterilization abuse, particularly among poor and marginalized communities.

Madrigal v. Quilligan (United States, 1978)

- Madrigal v. Quilligan* was a civil rights lawsuit brought by ten Mexican American women who alleged that they had been subjected to involuntary sterilization at the Los Angeles County-USC Medical Center during the late 1960s and early 1970s.

Several women reported that they had been pressured to sign sterilization consent forms while experiencing the pain and vulnerability associated with childbirth. Some alleged that they had not received adequate explanations of the procedure, its permanence or the consequences of signing the documents. Language barriers and the patients' limited understanding of the medical procedures were also central issues in the case.

The federal court ruled in favour of the hospital and its medical personnel in 1978. Although the plaintiffs did not prevail in the lawsuit, their case contributed to public scrutiny of sterilization practices and helped bring about changes in informed-consent procedures. The case was later documented in the 2016 PBS documentary *No Más Bebés*, directed by Renee Tajima-Peña.

The case is frequently discussed in relation to the history of reproductive injustice and the disproportionate impact of coercive sterilization practices on Mexican American and other marginalized women in the United States.

Forced and coerced sterilization in Canada

Forced and coerced sterilization has also been documented in Canada, particularly among Indigenous women and other marginalized populations.

In 2021, the Standing Senate Committee on Human Rights published a report examining the history and continuing allegations of forced and coerced sterilization in Canada. The report described how Indigenous, Black and economically disadvantaged women were disproportionately affected by sterilization practices performed without free, prior and informed consent.

The committee heard testimony from survivors who described being pressured into sterilization procedures, including situations in which consent was obtained under conditions of vulnerability, inadequate information or threats. A subsequent report, *The Scars that We Carry: Forced and Coerced Sterilization of Persons in Canada – Part II*, published in 2022, further examined survivors' experiences and the lasting consequences of these practices.

These reports document the institutional and historical dimensions of reproductive abuse and emphasize the importance of informed consent and reproductive autonomy.

== See also ==
- Birth control
- Contraceptive security
- Domestic violence and pregnancy
- Forced marriage
- Forced pregnancy
- Forced abortion
- Paternity fraud
- Pharmaceutical fraud
- Pregnancy from rape
- Reproductive rights
- Sperm theft
- Teen dating violence
- Teenage pregnancy
- Timeline of reproductive rights legislation
