= Pre-conception counseling in the United States =

Pre-conception counseling in the United States allows for optimization of US prenatal care. Pre-conception counseling is a meeting with a health-care professional (generally a physician or midwife) by a woman before attempting to become pregnant. It generally includes a pre-conception risk assessment for any potential complications of pregnancy.

== Obstacles to pre-conception counseling in the United States ==
Obstacles to pre-conception counseling in the United States include:

- It is too late in unintended pregnancies. The rate of Unintended pregnancy in the United States is approximately 49%. Half of unintended pregnancies result from not using birth control, and 45% of them from using birth control inconsistently or incorrectly.
- Women not knowing, realizing, or understanding the benefits of visiting their physician or midwife before trying to become pregnant.
- Another common obstacle to pre-conception counseling and assessment may be the lack of health insurance. However, most insurances will cover this as a screening visit. Also, many physicians will do the pre-conception screening during a regular office visit or gynecological visit if the woman just informs the doctor of her desire to become pregnant. Most gynecologists will inquire about child-bearing intentions anyway.

== Screening and monitoring in the United States ==
Screening and monitoring of women prior to conception is recommended to include the following:

- Height and weight to calculate BMI
- Blood pressure
- Medical history
- Abdominal and pelvic examination
- Rubella
- Varicella
- Domestic violence
- Depression
- Blood lipids (cholesterol and HDL)
- Cervical screening

However, the overall lack of evidence precludes a recommendation for universal screening for thyroid disease in pregnancy.

=== Rubella screening ===
Screening for rubella susceptibility by history of vaccination or by serology is recommended in the US for all women of childbearing age at their first preconception counseling visit to reduce incidence of congenital rubella syndrome (CRS). It is recommended that all susceptible non-pregnant women of childbearing age should be offered rubella vaccination.

=== Varicella screening ===
Immunity status of varicella should be performed at the pre-conception counseling session, in order to prevent the occurrence of congenital varicella syndrome and other adverse effects of varicella in pregnancy. Generally, a person with a positive medical history of varicella infection can be considered immune. Among adults in the United States having a negative or uncertain history of varicella, approximately 85%-90% will be immune. Therefore, an effective method is that people with a negative or uncertain history of varicella infection have a serology to check antibody production before receiving the vaccine. The CDC recommends that all adults be immunized if seronegative.

=== Domestic violence ===
It is recommended to screen for domestic violence at a preconception visit, because domestic violence during pregnancy a risk factor for miscarriage, late entry into prenatal care, stillbirth, premature labor and birth, fetal injury and low birth weight, and detection can avail for specific counseling and intervention.

There is evidence that direct interview screening result in a higher rate of reporting prenatal domestic abuse than a written, self-report questionnaire method.

== Education ==
Education of women intending to be pregnant is recommended to include:

- Preterm labor education and prevention
- Substance use
- Weight and nutrition and pregnancy
- Domestic violence and pregnancy
- List of medications, dietary supplements, herbal supplements
- Accurate recording of menstrual dates
- Counseling in case of potential vaginal birth after Caesarean

== Vaccination and prophylaxis ==
Vaccination and other prophylaxis of women intending to become pregnant is recommended to include:

- Tdap or tetanus booster if needed
- rubella and/or varicella vaccination if needed. Conception should be avoided for 4 weeks after administration of live attenuated influenza vaccine or MMR vaccine.
- Hepatitis B vaccine
- Folic acid supplementation
