= Domestic violence and pregnancy =

Form of intimate partner violence

Pregnancy when coupled with domestic violence is a form of intimate partner violence (IPV) where health risks may be amplified. Abuse during pregnancy, whether physical, verbal or emotional, produces many adverse physical and psychological effects for both the mother and fetus. Domestic violence during pregnancy is categorized as abusive behavior towards a pregnant woman, where the pattern of abuse can often change in terms of severity and frequency of violence. Abuse may be a long-standing problem in a relationship that continues after a woman becomes pregnant or it may commence in pregnancy. Although female-to-male partner violence occurs in these settings, the overwhelming form of domestic violence is perpetrated by men against women. Pregnancy provides a unique opportunity for healthcare workers to screen women for domestic violence though a recent review found that the best way in which to do this is unclear. Reducing domestic violence in pregnancy should improve outcomes for mothers and babies though more good quality studies are needed to work out effective ways of screening pregnant women.

== Causes and triggers ==
Domestic abuse can be triggered by pregnancy for a number of reasons. Pregnancy itself can be used a form of coercion and the phenomenon of preventing an intimate partner's reproductive choice is referred to as reproductive coercion. Studies on birth control sabotage performed by males against female partners have indicated a strong correlation between domestic violence and birth control sabotage. Pregnancy can also lead to a hiatus of domestic violence when the abuser does not want to harm the unborn child. The risk of domestic violence for pregnant women is greatest immediately after childbirth.

Domestic violence can increase a woman's chances of becoming pregnant and the number of children she has, both because the woman may be coerced into sex and because she may be prevented from using birth control. A correlation has been shown between large families and domestic violence. Whereas previously it was thought that having many children and the resultant stress of large families increased likelihood domestic violence, it has been shown that the violence commonly predates the births.

== Birth control sabotage ==
Birth control sabotage, or reproductive coercion, is a form of coercion where someone manipulates another person's use of birth control - weakening efforts to prevent an unwanted pregnancy. Replacing birth control pills with fakes, puncturing condoms, and threats and violence are examples of prevention of an individual's attempt to avoid pregnancy. Pregnancy-promoting behavior of abusive male partners is one method of domestic violence and is associated with unwanted pregnancy, particularly in adolescents. Reproductive coercion itself is a form of domestic violence because it results from unwanted sexual activity and hinders a woman's ability to control her body. Forced pregnancy can also be a form of financial abuse when a woman becomes trapped in a relationship because the pregnancy has led to economic dependence for new mothers.

Unintended pregnancies are two to three times more likely to be associated with abuse than intended pregnancies. Research among adolescent populations shows females who experience IPV use condoms at low rates and are fearful of negotiating the use of condoms. In a study of sexually experienced women 15–19 in Uganda, surveys found that 14% of women's first sexual intercourse had been coerced. Of those 14%, the women were far more likely to be having unprotected sex without the use of modern contraceptives and to have had unintended pregnancies within the last six months compared to women who had not been sexually coerced. In Egypt, over 80% of rural women believe that beatings are sometimes justified and one of the most common reasons given as a just cause for beatings is refusing a man sex. This affects the ability of women to protect themselves from unwanted sexual contact and the consequences of sexual intercourse, such as pregnancy and sexually transmitted infections.

A study conducted by the Center for Impact Research on young mothers classified birth control sabotage into two categories: verbal and behavioral. Verbal sabotage is verbal or emotional pressure not to use birth control, or pressure to become pregnant. Behavioral sabotage is the use of force to prevent the use of birth control, or to have unprotected sexual intercourse.

== Mechanisms ==
In most cases, domestic violence can be prompted by or intensified by pregnancy, but in some cases domestic violence ends during pregnancy because the abuser makes a conscious effort to not harm the fetus.

=== Decreased violence ===
Domestic violence does not always increase during pregnancy and can even lead to a hiatus in violence. This phenomenon can provide protection for both the woman and child. Because this can lead to decreased violence, some women use pregnancy as a means of protection against domestic abuse. Since abuse generally restarts after the pregnancy ends, women may get pregnant intentionally to prevent violence. However, since women who have been abused before getting pregnant are more likely to experience violence during pregnancy, this is not a reliable means of protection.

=== Increased violence ===
Although pregnancy can be a protective period for some women, either in terms of a hiatus of pre-existing violence, for others it is a risk period during which abuse may begin or escalate. Women with violent partners have a hard time protecting themselves from unintended pregnancy and sexual violence can directly lead to pregnancy. Studies consistently indicate that domestic violence is more common in large families. However, international studies show that 25% of women are abused for the first time during pregnancy.

In one study conduct by Campbell et al., women were asked to speculate on why they thought they were abused during their pregnancies. The answers were categorized into four categories:

- Jealousy towards the unborn child
- Anger towards the unborn child
- Pregnancy specific violence not directed toward the child
- "Business as usual."

== Effects ==
There are many dangerous effects that violence during pregnancy can cause for both the mother and child. A violent pregnancy is considered high risk because verbal, emotional, and physical abuse all lead to adverse health consequences for both the mother and fetus. Violence during pregnancy has been associated with miscarriage, late prenatal care, stillbirth, preterm birth, fetal injury (including bruising, broken and fractured bones, stab wounds and low birth weight. Violence during pregnancy also leads to additional risks for the mother such as increased mental health problems, suicide attempts, worsening of chronic illness, injury, substance abuse, anxiety, stress, chronic pain, and gynecological problems. Women battered during pregnancy were more frequently and severely beaten throughout the course of their relationship compared to women who were not abused during pregnancy. IPV also accounts for a large portion of maternal mortality. Homicide is the second leading cause of injury related deaths in pregnant and post-partum women in the United States and a study conducted in hospital in India found that 16% of all deaths during pregnancy were a result of partner violence. Studies have also found a correlation between domestic violence and increased use of abortion. Pregnant abused women are less likely to report abuse or leave their abuser because of added financial and housing security concerns.

== Risk factors ==
Certain women are more likely to be abused during pregnancy than others. Women who have been abused before getting pregnant are at higher risk of violence during pregnancy. Abuse is not restricted to a specific socio-economic or demographic group of women or to a specific period in a woman's reproductive life.

In general, the rate of physical violence during pregnancy decreases as household income increases. Women whose total household income was less than $16,000 were much more likely to experience physical or sexual violence during pregnancy than women with a total household income over $16,000.

Partner violence in a relationship increases the chances of unintended pregnancy. A Canadian study that outlined causes of physical abuse identified "social instability" (e.g. low age, unmarried, lower level of education, and unemployment) as a trigger for violence and used unplanned pregnancies as an example. This suggests that partner violence can lead to increased unintended pregnancies which, in turn, increases physical abuse. Younger women are statistically more susceptible to reproductive coercion and this may be due to less experience in relationships and, for minors, less access to doctor's appointments and emergency contraception. Adolescents are especially at risk and teenage pregnancy is correlated with increased rates of domestic violence. Young women with older boyfriends are more likely to experience domestic violence. Women who experience physical violence from their husbands are less likely to use contraception and more likely to have an unwanted pregnancy.

== Epidemiology ==
A study done on reporting rates of domestic violence concluded that a woman's risk of physical and sexual violence during pregnancy is under-reported and underestimated. Each year, over 324,000 pregnant women are victims of domestic violence in the United States. A number of countries have sought to statistically estimate the number of adult women who have experienced domestic violence during pregnancy:

- United Kingdom prevalence: 3.4%
- United States prevalence: 3.4–33.7%
- Ireland prevalence: 12.5%
- Population studies from Canada, Chile, Egypt and Nicaragua: 6–15%

Incidence rates are higher for teenagers. The incidence rate for low-income teen mothers is as high as 38%.

== See also ==
- Abuse during childbirth
- Contraceptive security
- Effects of domestic violence on children
- Epidemiology of domestic violence
- Lautenberg Amendment
- Pregnancy from rape
- Reproductive rights
- Victimization
- Violence Against Women Act
- Unborn Victims of Violence Act
