= Forced pregnancy =

Act of forcing a woman or girl to become pregnant against her will

Forced pregnancy is the practice of forcefully impregnating a woman or girl without her consent. This act is often as part of a forced marriage, as part of a programme of breeding slaves, or as part of a programme of genocide. Forced pregnancy is a form of reproductive coercion.

Beyond the context of international law, forced pregnancy is defined more broadly, encompassing where abortion is denied, hindered, delayed, or made difficult, including coercive behavior such as threats or acts of violence by perpetrators. As of 2025, 24 countries completely codify forced continuation of pregnancy.

== Imperial Japan ==
Female prisoners of Unit 731 were forced to become pregnant for use in experiments.

== Bride kidnapping ==
The practices of bride kidnapping and forced marriage typically (with the exception of purely symbolic "bride kidnappings" which are actually consensual elopements) involve the rape of the "bride" with the intention of forcing her to become pregnant, putting her in a position where she becomes dependent on the rapist and his family and, because of cultural attitudes toward rape, unable to return to her own family. In Kyrgyzstan, thousands of young girls and women are kidnapped every year to be forced into marriage. Although the practice was outlawed in 2013, bride kidnapping continues to exist, with destructive consequences for society. It is often referred to as a tradition, perceived as the obvious thing to do when the male is ready for marriage.

== As a means of genocide ==
Rape, sexual slavery, and related actions including forced pregnancy, are now recognized under the Geneva Convention as crimes against humanity and war crimes; in particular from 1949, Article 27 of the Fourth Geneva Convention, and later also the 1977 Additional Protocols to the 1949 Geneva Conventions, explicitly prohibit wartime rape and enforced prostitution. The Rome Statute Explanatory Memorandum, which defines the jurisdiction of the International Criminal Court, recognises rape, sexual slavery, forced prostitution, and forced pregnancy as crimes against humanity if part of a widespread or systematic practice.

The International Criminal Tribunal for Rwanda identified rape as capable of amounting to genocide when used systematically or on a mass scale to destroy a people; later the International Criminal Tribunal for the former Yugoslavia also categorized rape as capable of being a crime against humanity. In 2008 the U.N. Security Council's resolution 1820 identified such acts as capable of being "war crimes, crimes against humanity or ... genocide". Despite these measures, rape, whether systematic or otherwise, remains widespread in conflict zones.

== See also ==
- Eugenics
- Forced abortion
- Forced fatherhood
- Forced sterilization
- Genocide
- Reproductive coercion
- Pregnancy from rape
- Sexual slavery
- War on women
