= Nutrition and pregnancy =

Nutrient intake and dietary planning undertaken before, during, and after pregnancy

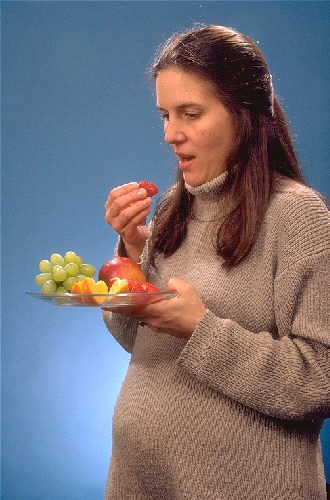
Pregnant woman eating fruit

Nutrition and pregnancy refers to the nutrient intake and dietary planning that is undertaken before, during, and after pregnancy. Nutrition of the fetus begins at conception. For this reason, the nutrition of the mother is important from before conception (probably several months before) as well as throughout pregnancy and breastfeeding. An ever-increasing number of studies have shown that the nutrition of the mother will have an effect on the child, up to and including the risk for cancer, cardiovascular disease, hypertension, and diabetes throughout life.

An inadequate or excessive amount of some nutrients may cause malformations or medical problems in the fetus, and neurological disorders and handicaps are a risk that is run by mothers who are malnourished. An estimated 24% of babies worldwide are born with lower than optimal weights at birth due to lack of proper nutrition. Personal habits such as consumption of alcohol or large amounts of caffeine can negatively and irreversibly affect the development of the baby, which happens in the early stages of pregnancy.

Caffeine consumption during pregnancy is associated with an increased risk of pregnancy loss. The available research favors the notion that the benefits of fish consumption during pregnancy outweigh the risks; however, the type of fish is important. Folic acid, which is the synthetic form of the vitamin folate, is critical both in pre- and peri-conception.

== Nutrition before pregnancy ==
As with most diets, there are chances of over-supplementing. However, as general advice, both state and medical recommendations are that mothers follow instructions listed on particular vitamin packaging as to the correct or recommended daily allowance (RDA). Daily prenatal use of iron substantially improves birth weight, potentially reducing the risk of low birth weight.

- Folic acid supplementation is recommended before conception, to prevent the development of spina bifida and other neural tube defects. It should be taken as at least 0.4 mg/day throughout the first trimester of pregnancy, 0.6 mg/day throughout the pregnancy, and 0.5 mg/day while breastfeeding in addition to eating foods rich in folic acid such as green leafy vegetables.
- Iodine levels are frequently too low in pregnant women, and iodine is necessary for normal thyroid function and mental development of the fetus, even cretinism. Pregnant women should take prenatal vitamins containing iodine.
- Vitamin D levels vary with exposure to sunlight. While it was assumed that supplementation was necessary only in areas of high latitudes, recent studies of Vitamin D levels throughout the United States and many other countries have shown a large number of women with low levels. For this reason, there is a growing movement to recommend supplementation with 1000 IU of Vitamin D daily throughout pregnancy.
- A large number of pregnant women have been found to have low levels of vitamin B12, but supplementation has not yet been shown to improve pregnancy outcome or the health of the newborn.
- Long-chain polyunsaturated fatty acids, specifically docosahexaenoic acid (DHA) and eicosapentaenoic acid (EPA), are beneficial for fetal development. Several studies have shown a lower risk of preterm delivery and low birth weight in mothers with higher intakes.
- Iron is needed for the healthy growth of the fetus and placenta, especially during the second and third trimesters. It is recommended that the first and third trimesters retain concentrations greater than 11 grams/deciliter and that the second trimester has levels above 10.5 grams per deciliter. It is also essential before pregnancy for the production of hemoglobin. There is no evidence that a hemoglobin level of 7 grams/100 ml or higher is detrimental to pregnancy, but it must be acknowledged that maternal hemorrhage is a major source of maternal mortality worldwide, and a reserve capacity to carry oxygen is desirable. Iron supplementation reduces the risk of maternal anaemia and iron deficiency in pregnancy but the positive effect on other maternal and infant outcomes is less clear.

== During pregnancy ==
Prevalence of vitamin a deficiency in pregnant women

The United States and the European Union have established vitamin and mineral recommendations during pregnancy and lactation. The amounts in the table below are the higher of the two. The citations separately list recommendations for pregnancy and lactation. Recommendations (RDAs = Recommended Dietary Allowances and PRIs = Population Reference Intakes) are set higher than what has been determined to be average requirements so as to address women who have above-average needs. For some nutrients, there is not enough information to set a recommendation, so the term Adequate Intake (AI) is used based on what appears to be sufficient.

Nutrient	U.S. RDA or AI	EU PRI or AI	Unit
Vitamin A	900	1300	μg
Vitamin C	90	155	mg
Vitamin D	15	15*	μg
Vitamin K	120*	70*	μg
α-tocopherol (Vit E)	15	11*	mg
Thiamin (Vit B_{1})	1.2	1.0	mg
Riboflavin (Vit B_{2})	1.3	2.0	mg
Niacin (Vit B_{3})	16	16	mg
Pantothenic acid (Vit B_{5})	5*	7*	mg
Vitamin B_{6}	1.3	1.8	mg
Biotin (Vit B_{7})	30*	45*	μg
Folate (Vit B_{9})	400	600	μg
Cyanocobalamin (Vit B_{12})	2.4	5.0*	μg
Choline	550*	520*	mg
Calcium	1000	1000	mg
Chloride	2300*	NE†	mg
Chromium	35*	NE†	μg
Copper	900	1500*	μg
Fluoride	4*	2.9*	mg
Iodine	150	200*	μg
Iron	18	16	mg
Magnesium	420	300*	mg
Manganese	2.3*	3.0*	mg
Molybdenum	45	65*	μg
Phosphorus	700	550*	mg
Potassium	4700*	4000*	mg
Selenium	55	85*	μg
Sodium	1500*	NE†	mg
Zinc	11	14.9	mg

*Adequate Intake
†Not established. The EU has not identified an AI for sodium or chloride, and does not consider chromium to be an essential mineral nutrient.

=== Vitamin and mineral supplements ===
Multiple micronutrient supplements taken with iron and folic acid may improve birth outcomes for women in low-income countries. These supplements reduce the number of low birth weight babies, small for gestational age babies, and stillbirths in women who may not have many micronutrients in their usual diets. Undernourished women can benefit from having dietary education sessions and balanced energy and protein supplements. A review showed that dietary education increased the mother's protein intake and helped the baby grow more inside the womb. The balanced protein and energy supplement lowered the risk of stillbirth in small babies and increased weight gain for both the mother and baby. Although more research is needed into the longer-term effects on the mothers' and infants' health, the short-term effects look promising. A review conducted in 2018 found that there was a slight benefit for lipid-based nutritional supplements (LNS) for newborn birth weight, length, small for gestational age, and stunting when compared with iron-folic acid (IFA). In the same study, IFA and multiple micronutrients (MMN) reduced maternal anemia better than LNS, but care is advised in interpreting and applying the results due to review limitations.

Prenatal vitamins typically contain increased amounts of folic acid, iodine, iron, vitamin A, vitamin D, zinc, and calcium over the amounts found in standard multi-vitamins. Currently, there is insufficient evidence that zinc supplements during pregnancy result in improved neonatal or maternal outcomes. The World Health Organization does not routinely recommend zinc supplementation for all pregnant women.

Approximately 30 grams (1.1 oz) of calcium is accumulated during pregnancy, almost all of it in the fetal skeleton (25 g). Calcium supplementation may result in little to no difference in preeclampsia. Low-quality evidence also suggests that calcium supplementation may reduce the risk of the mother having the baby before the 37th week of pregnancy (preterm birth).

A mother's nutritional intake during pregnancy is believed to influence and possibly offer protective effects against the development of allergic diseases and asthma in children. Maternal intake of vitamin D, vitamin E, and zinc has all been associated with a lower likelihood of wheezing in childhood, suggesting a protective effect. Additionally, maternal intake of omega-3 long-chain polyunsaturated fatty acids (n-3 LC-PUFAs) has been associated with a reduced risk of the development of eczema in childhood and reduced likelihood for infants to exhibit sensitivity to foods in the first year of life.

==== Folic acid ====
Folic acid, which is the synthetic form of the vitamin folate, is critical both in pre- and peri-conception. Deficiencies in folic acid may cause neural tube defects (NTDs). Women who had 0.4 mg of folic acid in their systems due to supplementing 3 months before childbirth significantly reduced the risk of NTDs. More than 80 countries use fortification of certain foods with folic acid as a measure to decrease the rate of NTDs.

==== Vitamins C and E ====
The combination of vitamin E and vitamin C supplemented to pregnant women does not appear to be efficacious for reducing risk of stillbirth, neonatal death, preterm birth, preeclampsia or any other maternal or infant outcomes, either in healthy women or those considered at risk for pregnancy complications. Antioxidant vitamins as dietary supplements have been proposed as having benefits if consumed during pregnancy. For the combination of vitamin E with vitamin C supplemented to pregnant women, a Cochrane review of 21 clinical trials concluded that the data do not support vitamin E supplementation – majority of trials alpha-tocopherol at 400 IU/day plus vitamin C at 1000 mg/day – as being efficacious for reducing risk of stillbirth, neonatal death, preterm birth, preeclampsia or any other maternal or infant outcomes, either in healthy women or those considered at risk for pregnancy complications. The review identified only three small trials in which vitamin E was supplemented without co-supplementation with vitamin C. None of these trials reported any clinically meaningful information. A second Cochrane review of 29 trials, published same year, reported on the same combination trials but added analysis of trials with vitamin C alone. The conclusion was that the data do not support routine vitamin C supplementation alone or in combination with other supplements for the prevention of fetal or neonatal death, poor fetal growth, preterm birth, or preeclampsia.

==== Vitamin B12 ====
For vitamin B12, the U.S. Recommended Dietary Allowance (RDA) for pregnancy is 2.6 μg/day, for lactation 2.8 μg/day. Determination of these values was based on an RDA of 2.4 μg/day for non-pregnant women, plus what will be transferred to the fetus during pregnancy and what will be delivered in breast milk. However, looking at the same scientific evidence, the European Food Safety Authority (EFSA) sets adequate intake (AI) at 4.5 μg/day for pregnancy and 5.0 μg/day for lactation. Low maternal vitamin B_{12}, defined as serum concentration less than 148 pmol/L, increases the risk of miscarriage, newborn low birth weight and preterm birth. During pregnancy the placenta concentrates B_{12}, so that newborn infants have a higher serum concentration than their mothers. What the mother-to-be consumes during the pregnancy is more important than her liver tissue stores, as it is recently absorbed vitamin content that more effectively reaches the placenta. Women who consume a small percentage of their diet from animal-sourced foods or who by choice consume a vegetarian or vegan diet are at higher risk than those consuming higher amounts of animal-sourced foods of becoming vitamin depleted during pregnancy, which can lead to anemia, and also an increased risk that their breastfed infants become vitamin deficient.

=== Food safety ===
Pregnant women are advised to pay attention to the foods they eat during pregnancy to reduce the risk of exposure to substances or bacteria that may be harmful to the developing fetus. This can include potentially harmful pathogens such as listeria, toxoplasmosis, and salmonella. Intake of large amounts of retinol has been linked to birth defects and abnormalities.

=== Water ===
During pregnancy, a woman's mass increases by about 12 kg (26 lb). The European Food Safety Authority recommends an increase of 300 mL per day compared to the normal intake for non-pregnant women, taking the total adequate water intake (from food and fluids) to 2,300 mL, or approximately 1,850 mL/ day from fluids alone.

=== Caffeine ===
Caffeine consumption during pregnancy is associated with increased risk of pregnancy loss and increased risk of low birth weight, defined as below 2500 grams (5.5 pounds). The European Food Safety Authority and the American Congress of Obstetricians and Gynecologists concur that habitual caffeine consumption up to 200 mg per day by pregnant women does not give rise to safety concerns for the fetus. The United Kingdom Food Standards Agency had recommended that pregnant women should limit their caffeine intake to less than 300 mg of caffeine a day, but in 2009 revised that downward to less than 200 mg of caffeine a day.

High doses of caffeine intake during pregnancy may increase the risk of miscarriage and some major negative pregnancy outcomes, such as stillbirth or low birth weight.

A 2020 review called into question the safe levels proposed by the European Food Safety Authority, the American Congress of Obstetricians and Gynecologists, the National Health Service, and the Dietary Guidelines for Americans. It found that the current scientific evidence does not support moderate caffeine consumption during pregnancy as safe, and advised pregnant women and women contemplating pregnancy to avoid caffeine.

=== Alcohol ===
Fetal alcohol spectrum disorders are a group of conditions that can occur in a person whose mother drank alcohol during pregnancy. The most severe form of the condition is known as fetal alcohol syndrome. Problems may include an abnormal appearance, short height, low body weight, small head size, poor coordination, low intelligence, behavior problems, hearing loss, and vision problems. Those affected are more likely to have trouble in school, legal problems, participate in high-risk behaviors, and have trouble with alcohol and recreational drug use. Fetal alcohol syndrome usually occurs when a pregnant woman has more than four drinks per day. Milder symptoms have been found with two drinks per day during the early part of pregnancy. Evidence of harm from less than two drinks per day or 10 drinks per week is not clear.

The American Academy of Pediatrics established a conservative set of recommendations in 2015: "During pregnancy: no amount of alcohol intake should be considered safe; there is no safe trimester to drink alcohol; all forms of alcohol, such as beer, wine, and liquor, pose similar risk; and binge drinking poses dose-related risk to the developing fetus." The World Health Organization recommends that alcohol should be avoided entirely during pregnancy, given the relatively unknown effects of even small amounts of alcohol during pregnancy.

=== Fish and omega-3 fatty acids ===
Fish consumption during pregnancy is encouraged by European, Australian, and American guidelines. The reason given is that fat-containing fish such as salmon and tuna contain eicosapentaenoic acid (EPA) and docosahexaenoic acid (DHA). These are termed long chain, omega-3, polyunsaturated fatty acids, and are considered important for fetal neurodevelopment. Additionally, fish are good sources of vitamins A, D, and B12, as well as the mineral iodine.

Due to the risks of heavy-metal toxicity on fetal neurodevelopment, many mothers are concerned about eating fish during pregnancy. Overall, current research favors the notion that the benefits of fish consumption during pregnancy outweigh the risks; however, the type of fish is important. Current research suggests that 2-3 servings of low-methylmercury containing fish per week in pregnancy is both safe and beneficial. Mercury accumulates in fish through their own diet (bioaccumulation). A general rule of thumb is that fish higher up on the food chain, and with longer life spans, will contain higher levels of mercury. Fish lower on the food chain and with shorter life spans will have lower metal content. However, the bioaccumulation of metals in fish is also dependent on geographical location, so it is hard to make global recommendations on specific fish species. An alternative to consuming fish is to use fish oil dietary supplements containing both EPA and DHA, or algae-derived DHA-only oils. The New York Times reported on a laboratory evaluation of 30 popular fish oil supplements. Some of those had less than the label claimed amounts of DHA. As for safety, "All of the products tested contained only very low levels of mercury, ranging from one to six parts per billion per serving. That range is far below the upper safety limit of 100 parts per billion set by the Global Organization for EPA and DHA Omega-3s, an industry trade group."

== Nutrition after pregnancy ==
Proper nutrition is important after delivery to help the mother recover, and to provide enough food energy and nutrients for a woman to breastfeed her child. Women having serum ferritin less than 70 μg/L may need iron supplements to prevent iron deficiency anaemia during pregnancy and postpartum.

During lactation, water intake may need to be increased. Human milk is made of 88% water, and the IOM recommends that breastfeeding women increase their water intake by about 300 mL/day to a total volume of 3000 mL/day (from food and drink), approximately 2,400 mL/day from fluids.

== See also ==
- Fetal alcohol spectrum disorder
- Prenatal nutrition
- Smoking and pregnancy
