= Pre-conception counseling =

Discussions with those interested in pregnancy

Preconception care (also called preconception counseling) is an informative discussion with a healthcare professional (generally a physician or advanced practice provider) by an individual interested in a future pregnancy. The goal of preconception care is to educate individuals and couples on the importance of health optimization before pregnancy to reduce the risk of pregnancy complications and promote a healthy intrauterine environment for normal fetal growth and development. It generally includes a preconception risk assessment for identification of potential complications of pregnancy and intervention to minimize risk factors, such as increasing folic acid intake to reduce the risk of neural tube defects and counseling individuals on smoking cessation, alcohol reduction, and medications that may compromise fetal development.

The general recommendation holds that an individual should, optimally, schedule preconception counseling for six months before getting pregnant. This time frame allows the individual to better prepare their body for successful conception (fertilization) and pregnancy, and allows them to reduce controllable health risks. Agencies such as the March of Dimes have developed screening tools that healthcare providers can use with their patients. In addition, obstetricians or midwives (see Obstetrics, Midwifery, General Practitioner) have developed comprehensive checklists and assessments for the woman who is planning to become pregnant.

In one sense, preconception counseling and assessment can be compared to a well-baby visit in which a baby is screened for normal health and normal development, with the benefit of identifying emerging problems that may have gone unnoticed in an infant. For the potential parent, the Preconception Counseling Assessment and Screening is intended to assess health, identifying:

- Existing or emerging illness or disease which may have gone undetected before, and
- Existing risks for the woman who may become pregnant, and
- Existing risks which may affect a fetus if the woman does become pregnant.

== Risk and risk reduction ==
Reducing an individual's risk factors that may affect future pregnancy is one of the primary goals of preconception care. As such, much of the counseling process is devoted to assessing the probability of anomalies that might arise during pregnancy. Any risk reduction that occurs at this stage falls under the first phase of pregnancy risk prevention: primary prevention, to avoid birth-related complications and congenital defects. General preconception counseling guidelines instruct physicians to limit unnecessary or invasive health interventions, increase individuals' self-care capacity before, throughout, and after pregnancy, reduce the number of unwanted pregnancies, and determine and treat behaviors that might result in poor care by individuals, their partners, and other family members. Medical consensus agrees that risk reduction efforts should begin three to six months before conception.

== Obstacles to preconception counseling ==
One obstacle to the ubiquity of preconception counseling and assessment is that globally, 38% of pregnancies are unintended. For this reason, some medical professionals recommend that all women of childbearing age be offered preconception care counseling regardless of intent to become pregnant.

Another common obstacle to preconception counseling and assessment is that women do not know about it or understand the benefits of visiting their physician or midwife before trying to become pregnant. Most women still take the biological aspects of becoming pregnant for granted and do not consider the value of pre-screening. In the majority of cases, women do not think about having a baby who has any kind of problem. Most women do not know how their own medical history could pose risks to a developing fetus. Likewise, they may not understand that pregnancy carries a certain number of risks as well. When family history risks and pregnancy risks are considered together, it may point to potential problems for that particular woman or to her unborn baby once she becomes pregnant. Therefore, comprehensive preconception counseling and genetic screening can be invaluable in preparing for a healthy pregnancy and minimizing these risks.

== What is involved in preconception counseling ==
=== Questionnaire ===
Pre-screening covers many body-system areas (not just the reproductive organs), as well as aspects of the woman's lifestyle and family history information. It begins with basic information and becomes more in-depth, especially if the woman has had previous illnesses, diseases, etc. Pre-screening assessments begin with a questionnaire which the woman fills out, generally before seeing the physician or midwife. Some offices have the woman go over parts of the questionnaire with a Nurse Practitioner, if available.

=== Blood work ===
Certain blood work may be ordered. Preconception counseling and testing identify couples at risk for hemoglobinopathies that might affect their offspring. This often includes a CBC (Complete Blood Count) which can show anemia. A CBC includes WBC (White Blood Cell Count) which can show the presence of infection. Anemia and infection, indicating problems with the woman's overall health at that moment, can both affect a woman's ability to become pregnant at that time as well as affect the stability of the pregnancy and the health of the fetus. In the majority of cases, both infection and anemia can be treated once the cause is identified. Anemia may require ongoing evaluation and iron supplementation. Based on these results, patients may be offered genetic counseling, hematology consultation, and fetal diagnostic testing.

=== Urinalysis ===
Urine sample or urinalysis can reveal the presence of proteinuria (protein in the urine), a possible indicator of infection or kidney disease, or the presence of blood which can indicate a urinary tract infection. Urinalysis might also show the presence of glucose (glycosuria), but women of child-bearing age are unlikely to have undiagnosed diabetes (this is separate from gestational diabetes that may occasionally develop during the course of a subsequent pregnancy).

== Using the assessment ==
=== Physicians ===
When women have preexisting illnesses, conditions, or diseases, these may add to prenatal risks and will need ongoing evaluation. Also any medications which are used to treat these conditions will need to be monitored and possibly reduced or increased.

The presence of diabetes remains a huge risk for the unborn child, and a woman will be screened specifically for this condition. Known diabetics will need to be monitored closely. For more information on diabetes-related pregnancy risks, see additional sources.

=== The woman's role ===
A woman may need to adjust certain aspects of her health and well-being which are in her control. These usually include aspects of lifestyle, drug and alcohol use, exercise, rest and stress reduction. In addition, she may need to discontinue certain herbs or over-the-counter medications as recommended by her healthcare provider. Many physicians will also recommend prenatal vitamins before a woman actually conceives to boost her overall health.

== In the United States ==
Pre-conception counseling in the United States is recommended to include:

- Height and weight to calculate BMI
- Blood pressure
- Medical history
- Abdominal and pelvic examination
- Rubella screening
- Varicella screening
- Domestic violence screening
- Depression screening
- Testing for Gonorrhea and Chlamydia for women at high risk for STDs

== See also ==
- List of counseling topics
- Genetic testing
- Pre-implantation genetic diagnosis
