= Guere =

Guere may refer to:

- Guere, Cameroon, a commune in Cameroon
- Guéré, an alternative name for the Wè language
- Güere River, northern Venezuela
- Guéré, a wadi in the Borkou region, Chad
