= Pregnancy vegetarianism =

Pregnancy vegetarianism is the practice of adhering to a vegetarian diet during pregnancy. Vegetarianism is "the principle or practice of excluding all meat and fish, and sometimes, in the case of vegans, all animal products (such as eggs, milk, cheese, etc) from one's diet." Although some people frown upon pregnant women practicing vegetarianism, there is no evidence that vegetarianism—practiced properly—is unhealthful during pregnancy. There are millions of healthy babies born each year from vegetarian households.

== Protein consumption ==
Most opponents of pregnancy vegetarianism are concerned about the pregnant woman's protein intake because vegetarians do not eat chicken, fish, or beef. It is recommended, for example, that a pregnant woman should aim to have something from the four main food groups every day. These include fruit and vegetables, carbohydrates, protein-rich foods and dairy foods. There are several vegetarian sources of protein: soy, cooked dried beans or peas, tofu, nuts or seeds, peanut butter, and eggs. Vegetarians focus on foods that are normally left out of most non-meat pregnancy diets such as include beans, fresh dark green vegetables, and whole grains which are good sources of protein. The risks associated with vegetarianism, that is to say the problems vegetarians face, can generally be lessened by a careful diet. These problems that many associate with vegetarianism, such as anaemia, are in fact not due to the vegetarian diet alone, but more so to the fact that the subject in question has failed to supplement their body with the nutrition they require. When cutting out meats, some vegetarians fail to intake any other kinds of protein. To intake protein is very important during pregnancy as one of the cause of the anaemia is iron deficiency and it varies by region. The iron-deficiency anaemia increases the risk of low weight in birth and transmits the iron-deficiency to infants.

== Effect on weight gain ==
One benefit of adopting pregnancy vegetarianism, is the possibility of minimizing pregnancy weight gain. Because being a vegetarian is a choice less often chosen, many have described this control of weight as due to them being more conscious of their diet. A 2009 study showed that over 52 percent of pregnant women gain more weight than the recommended, 23-35 pounds. During the second and third trimester, the average diet needs only to be increased by 300 calories, and it may be argued that pregnancy vegetarianism may be a way of monitoring diet and calorie intake.

== Nutrients needed ==
According to dietitian Sarah Schenker, being a vegetarian during pregnancy is perfectly safe so long as a strict diet is being followed. By this she means that one must know exactly what their body needs and make sure that they are taking in these nutrients. A healthy diet is very important when pregnant as a vegetarian. Seeing a dietitian could be beneficial to one as they could provide guidelines which should be followed for a healthy lifestyle.

Pregnant woman should get enough omega-3s, vitamin B_{12}, and calcium. All these elements could be found in vegetarian meals and products. Omega-3s are found in dark leafy green vegetables, flax seed, walnuts, kidney and pinto beans, broccoli and squash. Calcium is found in cottage cheese and fortified plant-based drinks. Moreover, pregnant woman should get enough zinc, protein, and iron. These elements are found in peas and beans. Vegetables and fruits should be eaten every day more than five times in order to get enough vitamins.

However, as vegetarians have a greater exposure to phytoestrogens than omnivores, there are studies which support the possibility of negative effect on the developing male reproductive system and can increase the risk of the baby developing birth defects such as hypospadias.
