= Contraceptive security =

Individual's ability to choose, obtain, and use quality contraceptives

Contraceptive security is an individual's ability to reliably choose, obtain, and use quality contraceptives for family planning and the prevention of sexually transmitted diseases. The term refers primarily to efforts undertaken in low and middle-income countries to ensure contraceptive availability as an integral part of family planning programs. Even though there is a consistent increase in the use of contraceptives in low, middle, and high-income countries, the actual contraceptive use varies in different regions of the world. The World Health Organization recognizes the importance of contraception and describes all choices regarding family planning as human rights. Subsidized products, particularly condoms and oral contraceptives, may be provided to increase accessibility for low-income people. Measures taken to provide contraceptive security may include strengthening contraceptive supply chains, forming contraceptive security committees, product quality assurance, promoting supportive policy environments, and examining financing options.

== History ==
Contraception has been an active practice that dates back to ancient Egypt. It has played an important role in history and over time led to the development of organizations that provide contraceptive methods to the general public. In the United States, during the late 1800s contraception was often prohibited and deemed illegal in some states. This was largely driven by religion and other social misconceptions, often believed to promote recreational sex. However, more individuals across the world came to realize the importance of contraception and the benefit it could provide to individuals.

The first family planning clinic was opened in 1882 in the Netherlands by Aletta Jacobs. Activists in the early 1900s, such as Margaret Sanger, allowed contraception to become an option to couples that were not ready to conceive. In 1916, Sanger opened the first family planning clinic in Brooklyn, New York. It received a great deal of backlash from numerous individuals and was forced to close down a few days after opening.

Contraception became an even greater topic in the 1960s, after the creation of birth control and the intrauterine device (IUD). Both acted as a safer and more convenient method of contraception. Shortly thereafter in 1965, the United States Supreme Court ruled it unconstitutional for states to prevent married couples from attaining birth control during the Griswold versus Connecticut case.

In the mid-1960s, the United States government began to understand the importance of contraception in helping decrease the rapid acceleration in the world population. Access to contraception was only further strengthened by the passage of Title X of the Public Health Service Act in 1970, which aimed to help further establish contraceptive security in the United States. In the 1970s, numerous organizations, including governmental and nongovernmental, were formulated to help more individuals obtain family planning methods and services.

Over the years, this led to the development of non-government organizations such as the International Planned Parenthood Federation (IPPF), Marie Stopes International, Population Services International (PSI) and Women Deliver as well as bilateral organizations such as the Danish International Development Agency (DIDA), United Kingdom Department for International Development (DFID) and the United States Agency for International Development (USAID). These organizations work to provide contraceptive security in numerous countries via donations, tools, policies and frameworks. Additionally, the USAID partners with numerous private and public companies across the world to expand access to information and resources needed for family planning. Today contraceptive security is still an important topic, especially given its capability of reducing child and maternal mortality in some low and middle income countries.

== Importance ==
Contraceptives can prevent unintended pregnancies in individuals with uteruses, as well as protect individuals from contracting sexually transmitted infections and/or diseases (STIs/STDs). A person's access to contraception is critical for ensuring their optimal health and achieving their reproductive goals as it allows individuals to have control over their body and freedom to decide when to become a parent. It also gives couples the ability to choose how many children to raise and the spacing between each child. Moreover, contraceptive security can improve the socioeconomic conditions for individuals and their families, and advances their right to education and/or a career.

According to the United Nations Department of Economic and Social Affairs' Population Division in 2019, roughly 58% of 1.9 billion reproductive-age women (15–49 years) globally needed contraceptive methods; of these, roughly 17% of women have an unmet need for family planning. Contraceptive security is one way to improve maternal mortality rates. According to the CDC, the maternal mortality rate for 2020 increased 3.7% between 2019 and 2020. In 2017, about 295,000 women worldwide died during and following pregnancy or childbirth which occurred in low and lower middle-income countries. These death rates reflect inequalities in access to health services, such as access to contraceptives. Maternal mortality risk is higher in adolescents under 15 years of age and pregnancy/childbirth complications are higher among adolescent biological females ages 10–19 as compared to individuals with uteruses aged 20–24. Contraceptives can also prolong interbirth intervals, since short interbirth/interpregnancy intervals are associated with higher maternal mortality risk.

Contraceptive security relies on various governmental policies and programs to provide affordable, high-quality contraceptive products for individuals to choose, obtain, and use at their discretion. Strengthening contraceptive security requires routine monitoring of donor and government commitment, policies, stakeholder coordination, and supply chain information. Tools including the contraceptive security indicators and the contraceptive security index offer ways of measuring contraceptive security, and allow comparisons over time and across countries.

== Accessibility ==
=== North America ===
Access to healthcare is one barrier to contraceptives in North America. Access to healthcare includes cost, health and prescription insurance, having a healthcare provider, and being able to access a family planning clinic or facility, all of which vary among the countries in North America. Many forms of contraceptives require some form of interaction with a healthcare provider, such as a doctor or pharmacist, as they require a procedure or a prescription. Condoms are the most commonly used form of contraceptives since they are available over-the-counter and do not require a prescription. In the study, participants also stated they were less likely to access healthcare and reproductive services due to the fear of perceived stigma, including the stigma around being an immigrant or being a sex worker. Another important barrier to other forms of contraceptives is the limited education individuals have. Sex workers, for example, stated they learned about their contraception options from other sex workers or from healthcare providers after they had gotten pregnant.

In the United States, several contextual factors create barriers for contraceptive accessibility. These factors include, but are not limited to, race, sexuality, socioeconomic status, and gender identity.

=== Africa ===
While many other continents have relatively open access to contraceptives, individuals in Africa have a difficult time getting contraception. This is a result of poor funding, lack of social support, and unaffordable contraceptives. In Africa, around 80% of women do not use any form of contraception at all. One of the biggest reasons for this is because of how unaffordable contraceptives are for the average person in Africa. The majority of countries within Africa are considered LMIC (low-middle income countries). This makes it difficult for most working-class individuals to purchase contraception as, in Uganda, condoms can cost as much as 3000 Ugandan shillings (about 0.75 United States dollars). A singular condom would cost half of the monthly income of the average person living in sub-Saharan Africa. This cost also does not factor in transportation costs that individuals would incur getting to the urban areas which sell these contraceptives.

Religion and culture also play a very large role into the decision that many women make on whether or not to use contraception in Africa. In Luweero, it is typically desirable to have very large families and thus affects decisions on family planning and contraceptive use. On top of this, many Catholic and Muslim communities believe that God have a set plan for each individual and that contraceptive use directly goes against those beliefs.

Many villages in Africa do not have accurate sexual education available for their people. There are many misconceptions about contraception that include things such as; IUD's can enter your heart and cause death or that contraception will cause permanent infertility. Sometimes, these rumors stem from individuals' general distrust of the government. There are often negative social stigmas that are attached to the use or implantation of contraceptive devices which further discourages individuals from using them. Men are also discouraged from supporting contraceptive use as many believe that it will encourage their wives to be unfaithful.

According to a study done in Sub-Saharan Africa, "about 13% of pregnancies end up in abortions and 97% of these are unsafe" (Bain, 2021). Many of these pregnancies occur in adolescent women, a time in their lives when childbearing has more complications, higher maternal mortality rates, and miscarriage.

=== Europe ===
Although Europe is relatively receptive of contraception use, some countries in Europe differ on contraceptive accessibility, education, and usage. A study conducted by the International Health Foundation polled 6630 women from European countries including Germany, Poland, Denmark, and Italy which had shown that there was a relatively variable use of contraception from country to country. When reviewing what types of contraception were most common in each country, it was shown that IUDs (intrauterine devices) and oral contraceptives were most commonly used in Denmark, Germany, and Northern Italy. Poland more commonly adopts more traditional contraceptive techniques such as periodic abstinence and withdraw. Individuals also reported that voluntary sterilization (for both males and females) was most common among Germany, Spain, and Denmark.

Another study done about natural family planning showed that only about 47% of married couples have used some for of contraception in Western Europe. Some barriers to access to contraceptives include inadequate sexuality education, nonoptimal family planning resources, and high cost as not all Western European countries cover contraceptives under their health insurance plans. Each country in Europe addresses accessibility to contraceptives differently.

In Germany, various laws including the 1968 United Nations International Conference of Human Rights has made many things such as family planning services and access to contraception a human right. Germany requires a prescription for many of their contraceptives including IUD's and birth control. They have mandatory health insurance for woman under the age of 18, and these contraceptives are typically covered by that insurance (they typically only need to pay a 10% copay). In Romania, citizens are able to obtain contraceptives for free and citizens are required to contribute to a healthcare fund. This healthcare fund allows individuals access to things like family planning consultations, subsidized contraceptives, as well as social benefits. Although this healthcare fund is in place, a study has shown that accessibility to these services is increasingly difficult as they are not widely advertised and will not often be offered unless first requested. In Spain, condoms are widely available free of charge, and emergency contraception is required to be dispensed by law without a prescription or age limitations. In the UK, individuals are able to receive hormonal contraception for free if they have a prescription. Their goal is to reduce unplanned pregnancies, decrease abortion rates, and lower STD transmission. For most European countries, contraception seems to be mostly widely available and quite accessible to the typical individual.

=== Asia ===
In Asian countries, such as Pakistan, there are other factors that can influence one's openness to contraceptives, including social constraints and familial restraints. Pakistan follows a conservative cultural approach to family planning and views each child as a gift. This belief and society has made many families reluctant to use contraceptives. The decision to start using contraceptives depends on both partners and both sets of in-laws, which tends to be the greatest barrier for those intending on family planning.

In a study conducted in the Philippines, it was found that the country complied with four of nine World Health Organization recommendations on family planning. Among the five recommendations that were not met were accessibility, availability, and informed-consent—all three of which may restrict contraceptive security. In the case of the Philippines, the availability recommendations were unmet due to the law that prohibits the use of emergency contraception in any government hospitals. Regarding accessibility, the reproductive health laws outline ways to provide contraceptives to those with lower-incomes; however, the main constraint that remains is that parental consent is required in the case of an adolescent requesting contraceptives.

One motive to improve contraceptive accessibility in some countries is population control. In China, all forms of contraceptives are free in urban areas. China is currently working on improving woman's reproductive, maternal, newborn, child, and adolescent health (RMNCAH). In regards to contraceptive security, this movement includes utilizing contraceptives to appropriately space second pregnancies between 18 and 59 months after childbirth. This spacing of intervals is supported by an international study that found that more adverse events occurred during the perinatal period. These efforts are working toward improving reproductive and newborn health through the use of contraceptives.

== See also ==
- Family planning
- Birth Control
- Contraceptive mandate
- Reproductive Health
